= List of synagogues in the United States =

This is a list of notable synagogues in the United States.

== By state ==
=== Alabama ===
- Temple Beth-El, Anniston
- Temple Beth-El, Birmingham
- Temple Emanu-El, Birmingham
- Knesseth Israel, Birmingham
- Temple B'nai Sholom, Huntsville
- Sha’arai Shomayim Congregation, Mobile
- Agudath Israel Etz Ahayem, Montgomery
- Temple Beth Or, Montgomery

==== Former synagogues ====
- B'nai Jeshurun, Demopolis
- Beth Israel Congregation, Gadsden

=== Arizona ===
- Beth Israel, Scottsdale
- Temple Emanuel, Tempe
- Kol Ami, Tucson

==== Former synagogues ====
- Temple Beth Israel, Phoenix (former: 1921–1949, now museum)
- Tucson Jewish Museum & Holocaust Center, located in the oldest synagogue in the state

=== Arkansas ===
- Temple Shalom of Northwest Arkansas, Fayetteville

==== Former synagogue ====
- Temple Meir Chayim, McGehee (1947–2016)

=== California ===
- Congregation Beth Israel, Berkeley
- Beyt Tikkun Synagogue, Berkeley
- Peninsula Temple Sholom, Burlingame
- Congregation B'nai Israel, Daly City
- Temple Beth Israel, Fresno
- Temple Ahavat Shalom Northridge, Los Angeles
- Congregation Beth Am, Los Angeles
- Beth Chayim Chadashim, Los Angeles
- Temple Beth Israel of Highland Park and Eagle Rock, Los Angeles
- Beth Jacob Congregation, Los Angeles
- Temple Emanuel, Los Angeles
- Temple Israel of Hollywood, Los Angeles
- IKAR, Los Angeles
- Kehillat Israel, Los Angeles
- Pacific Jewish Center, Los Angeles
- Sephardic Temple Tifereth Israel, Los Angeles
- Sinai Temple, Los Angeles
- Valley Beth Shalom Synagogue, Los Angeles
- Wilshire Boulevard Temple, Los Angeles
- Stephen Wise Temple, Los Angeles
- Kehilla Community Synagogue, Oakland
- Temple Sinai, Oakland
- Jewish Temple and Center, Pasadena
- Congregation Ner Tamid, Rancho Palos Verdes
- Congregation B'nai Israel, Sacramento
- Congregation Beth Israel, San Diego
- Congregation Am Tikvah, San Francisco
- Congregation Beth Sholom, San Francisco
- Congregation Emanu-El, San Francisco
- Congregation Sherith Israel, San Francisco
- The Kitchen, San Francisco
- Rodef Sholom, San Rafael
- Temple Israel, Stockton
- Congregation Kol Shofar, Tiburon

==== Former synagogues ====
- Pioneer Jewish Synagogue, Jackson
- Breed Street Shul, Los Angeles
- Congregation B'nai David, San Francisco
- Bush Street Temple, San Francisco

=== Colorado ===
- Beth HaMedrosh Hagodol-Beth Joseph, Denver
- Temple Emanuel, Denver
- Temple Sinai, Denver
- Temple Emanuel, Pueblo
- Temple Aaron, Trinidad

=== Connecticut ===
- Congregation B'nai Israel, Bridgeport
- Beth Shalom Rodfe Zedek, Chester
- Congregation Knesseth Israel, Ellington
- Congregation Ahavath Achim, Fairfield
- Congregation Mishkan Israel, Hamden
- Congregation Beth Israel, Hartford (West)
- Hebrew Congregation of Woodmont, Milford
- Tephereth Israel Synagogue, New Britain
- Beth Israel Synagogue, New Haven
- Congregation Agudath Sholom, Stamford
- Temple Israel, Westport
- Congregation B'nai Jacob, Woodbridge

==== Former synagogues ====
- Bikur Cholim Synagogue, Bridgeport
- Ein Jacob (Ayn Yacob) Synagogue, Bridgeport
- Temple Beth Israel, Danielson
- Beth Hamedrash Hagodol Synagogue, Hartford
- Temple Beth Israel, Hartford
- Chevry Lomday Mishnayes Synagogue, Hartford
- Mather Homestead, Hartford
- Anshei Israel Synagogue, Lisbon
- Temple B'Nai Israel, New Britain
- Ahavas Sholem Synagogue, New Haven
- Ohev Sholem Synagogue, New London
- Beth Israel Synagogue, Norwalk
- Beth El Synagogue, Waterbury

=== District of Columbia ===
- Adas Israel Congregation
- Bet Mishpachah
- DC Minyan
- Kesher Israel Congregation
- Machar
- Ohev Sholom Congregation
- Rosh Pina
- Sixth & I Historic Synagogue
- Washington Hebrew Congregation

=== Florida ===
- Congregation Ahavath Chesed, Jacksonville
- Bet Shira Congregation, Miami
- Edmond J. Safra Synagogue, Miami
- Temple Beth Sholom, Miami Beach
- Cuban Hebrew Congregation, Miami Beach
- Temple Emanu-El, Palm Beach
- New Synagogue, Palm Beach
- Temple Beth-El, Pensacola

==== Former synagogues ====
- Beth Jacob Synagogue and Jewish Museum of Florida, Miami
- United Hebrews, Ocala

=== Georgia ===
- Congregation Beth Jacob, Atlanta
- Congregation Shearith Israel, Atlanta
- The Temple, Atlanta
- Congregation of B'nai Israel Synagogue, Augusta
- Temple Beth Israel, Macon
- Congregation B'nai Torah, Sandy Springs
- Congregation Mickve Israel, Savannah

=== Hawaii ===
- Aloha Jewish Chapel, Pearl Harbor
- Temple Emanu-El, Honolulu

=== Idaho ===
- Ahavath Beth Israel, Boise

=== Illinois ===
- Moses Montefiore Congregation, Bloomington
- Anshe Emet Synagogue, Chicago
- Anshe Sholom B'nai Israel, Chicago
- Beth Shalom, Chicago
- Emanuel Congregation, Chicago
- KAM Isaiah Israel, Chicago
- Loop Synagogue, Chicago
- Makom Solel Lakeside, Chicago
- Mishkan, Chicago
- North Shore Congregation Israel, Chicago
- North Suburban Synagogue Beth El, Chicago
- Temple Sholom, Chicago
- Sinai Conregation, Chicago
- Tzedek, Chicago
- Jewish Community Center, Mattoon
- Congregation Anshai Emeth, Peoria

==== Former synagogues ====
- Kehilath Anshe Ma'arav, Chicago (first KAM Isaiah Israel synagogue, now Baptist church)
- Congregation Or Chadash, Chicago
- B'nai Sholom Temple, Quincy

=== Indiana ===
- Congregation Achduth Vesholom, Fort Wayne
- Indianapolis Hebrew Congregation, Indianapolis

==== Former synagogues ====
- Temple Israel, Lafayette
- Ahavas Shalom Reform Temple, Ligonier
- Ballpark Synagogue, South Bend

=== Iowa ===
- B'nai Israel Synagogue, Council Bluffs
- Beit Shalom Jewish Community, Davenport
- Mount Sinai Temple, Sioux City

==== Former synagogues ====
- B'nai Jacob Synagogue, Ottumwa

=== Kansas ===
- Congregation Beth Israel Abraham Voliner, Overland Park
- The Temple, Congregation B'nai Jehudah, Overland Park

=== Kentucky ===
- Congregation Adath Israel Brith Sholom, Louisville
- Anshei Sfard, Louisville
- Keneseth Israel, Louisville
- Temple Adath Israel, Owensboro
- Temple Israel, Paducah

==== Former synagogues ====
- Congregation Agudath Achim, Ashland

=== Louisiana ===
- B'nai Israel Traditional Synagogue, Alexandria
- Congregation Gemiluth Chassodim, Alexandria
- Anshe Sfard, New Orleans
- Congregation Beth Israel, New Orleans
- Temple Sinai, New Orleans
- Touro Synagogue, New Orleans
- B'Nai Zion Temple, Shreveport

==== Former synagogues ====
- Shangarai Chasset, New Orleans

=== Maine ===
- Congregation Beth Israel, Bangor
- Etz Chaim Synagogue, Portland
- Shaarey Tphiloh, Portland

=== Maryland ===
- Naval Academy Jewish Chapel, Annapolis
- B'nai Israel Synagogue, Baltimore
- Baltimore Hebrew Congregation, Baltimore
- Beth Am, Reservoir Hill, Baltimore
- Congregation Shearith Israel, Baltimore
- Congregation Shomrei Emunah, Baltimore
- Congregation Tiferes Yisroel, Baltimore
- Congregation Beth El, Bethesda
- Bethesda Jewish Congregation, Bethesda
- Beth Shalom Congregation, Columbia
- B'er Chayim Temple, Cumberland
- Temple B'Nai Israel, Easton
- Beth Sholom Congregation, Frederick
- Congregation Kol Ami of Frederick, Frederick
- Chabad of Silver Spring, Kemp Mill
- Kehillas Ohr Hatorah, Kemp Mill
- Kemp Mill Synagogue, Kemp Mill
- Yeshiva of Greater Washington, Kemp Mill
- Young Israel Shomrai Emunah, Kemp Mill
- Temple Emanuel, Kensington
- Oseh Shalom Synagogue, Laurel
- Magen David Sephardic Congregation, North Bethesda
- Ohev Sholom Talmud Torah Congregation of Olney, Olney
- Beth El Congregation, Pikesville
- Beth Tfiloh Congregation, Pikesville
- Har Sinai – Oheb Shalom Congregation, Pikesville
- Beth Sholom Congregation and Talmud Torah, Potomac
- Magen David Sephardic Congregation, Rockville
- B'nai Israel Congregation, Rockville
- Beth Israel Congregation, Salisbury

==== Former synagogues ====
- Baltimore Hebrew Congregation Synagogue, Baltimore
- Eutaw Place Temple, Baltimore
- Lloyd Street Synagogue, Baltimore
- Shaarei Tfiloh Synagogue, Baltimore
- Temple Israel, Silver Spring

=== Massachusetts ===
- Temple Israel, Boston
- Temple Ohabei Shalom, Brookline
- Temple Shalom Emeth, Burlington
- Kahal B'raira, Cambridge
- Congregation Agudath Shalom, Chelsea
- Congregation Beth Israel, Malden
- Adams Street Shul, Newton
- Shaarei Tefillah, Newton
- Congregation Beth Israel, North Adams
- Congregation Beth Israel, Onset
- Temple Anshe Amunim, Pittsfield
- Sinai Temple, Springfield
- Ahavath Torah, Stoughton
- Congregation Beth Israel, Worcester
- Temple Emanuel Sinai, Worcester

==== Former synagogues ====
- Congregation Adath Jeshurun, Boston
- Temple Israel, Boston, now Morse Auditorium
- The Vilna Shul, Boston
- Beth Israel Synagogue, Cambridge
- B'nai Abraham Congregation, Sandisfield, previously Montville Baptist Church, now the Sandisfield Arts Center
- Shaarai Torah Synagogue, Worcester
- Temple Beth Emunah (Brockton, Massachusetts

=== Michigan ===
- Temple Beth El, Alpena
- Temple Beth Emeth, Ann Arbor, a partner in Genesis of Ann Arbor
- Beth Israel Congregation, Ann Arbor
- Temple Beth El, Detroit
- Birmingham Temple, Detroit
- Isaac Agree Downtown Synagogue, Detroit
- Temple Emanuel, Grand Rapids
- Temple Jacob, Hancock
- Temple Beth Israel, Jackson
- Temple Beth Sholom, Marquette
- Temple Israel, West Bloomfield

==== Former synagogues ====
- Bethel Community Transformation Center, Detroit
- Temple Beth-El (former building), in the Bonstelle Theatre, Detroit

=== Minnesota ===
- Beth Jacob Congregation, Mendota Heights
- Temple Israel, Minneapolis
- Adath Jeshurun Congregation, Minnetonka
- Beth El Synagogue, St. Louis Park
- Mount Zion Temple, St. Paul
- Or Emet, St. Paul

==== Former synagogues ====
- Adas Israel Congregation, Duluth
- B'nai Emet Synagogue, St. Louis Park
- B'nai Abraham Synagogue, Virginia

=== Mississippi ===
- Temple Adath Israel, Cleveland
- Beth Israel Congregation, Jackson
- Congregation Beth Israel, Meridian
- Temple B'nai Israel, Tupelo

==== Former synagogues ====
- Temple B'nai Shalom, Brookhaven
- Temple Gemiluth Chessed, Port Gibson

=== Missouri ===
- United Hebrew Congregation, Chesterfield
- Tpheris Israel Chevra Kadisha, Chesterfield
- Nusach Hari B’nai Zion, University City
- Congregation B'nai Amoona, Creve Coeur
- Congregation Temple Israel, Creve Coeur
- Congregation Shaare Emeth, Creve Coeur
- Traditional Congregation, Creve Coeur
- Temple Beth El, Jefferson City

==== Former synagogues ====
- B'Nai Israel Synagogue, Cape Girardeau
- Shaare Zedek Synagogue University City

=== Montana ===
==== Former synagogues ====
- Temple Emanu-El, Helena

=== Nebraska ===
- Temple of Congregation B'nai Jeshurun, Lincoln

==== Former synagogues ====
- Tifereth Israel Synagogue, Lincoln

=== New Jersey ===
- Temple Beth Sholom, Cherry Hill
- Congregation Kol Ami, Cherry Hill
- Synagogue of Deal, Deal
- Beth Hillel Synagogue, Deerville
- Congregation Ahavath Torah, Englewood
- Barnert Temple, Franklin Lakes
- Agudath Achim, Freehold
- Congregation Etz Ahaim Sephardic, Highland Park
- United Synagogue of Hoboken, Hoboken
- Temple Beth-El, Jersey City
- Adas Emuno Congregation, Leonia
- Temple B'Nai Abraham, Livingston
- Temple Shaari Emeth, Manalapan
- Marlboro Jewish Center, Marlboro
- Congregation B'nai Israel, Millburn
- Temple Beth Hillel Beth Abraham, Millville
- Morristown Jewish Center, Morristown
- Reconstructionist Congregation Beth Israel, Ridgewood
- Rosenhayn Synagogue, Rosenhayn
- Oheb Shalom Congregation, South Orange
- Congregation Beth El, Voorhees

==== Former synagogues ====
- Congregation M'kor Shalom, Cherry Hill
- Temple Emanu-El of West Essex, Livingston
- Prince Street Synagogue, Newark, former home of Oheb Shalom Congregation, South Orange
- Congregation Adath Israel, Woodbridge

=== New Mexico ===
- Congregation Albert, Albuquerque
- Congregation B'nai Israel, Albuquerque

=== New York ===
In the Bronx

- Conservative Synagogue Adath Israel of Riverdale
- Hebrew Institute of Riverdale
- Riverdale Jewish Center
- Riverdale Temple

In Brooklyn

- Magen David Synagogue, Bensonhurst
- Chevra Anshei Lubawitz, Borough Park
- Congregation Shomrei Emunah, Borough Park
- Young Israel Beth El of Borough Park, Borough Park
- Kane Street Synagogue (Congregation Baith Israel Anshei Emes), Cobble Hill
- 770 Eastern Parkway, Crown Heights
- Chevra Ahavas Yisroel, Crown Heights
- Congregation Kol Israel, Crown Heights
- Beth El Jewish Center of Flatbush, Flatbush
- Khal Hisachdus Yirieim Veretzky, Flatbush
- Congregation Shaare Zion, Gravesend
- Edmond J. Safra Synagogue, Homecrest
- Ocean Parkway Jewish Center, Kensington
- Manhattan Beach Jewish Center, Manhattan Beach
- B'nai Yosef Synagogue, Mapleton
- East Midwood Jewish Center, Midwood
- Kingsway Jewish Center, Midwood
- Sephardic Center of Mill Basin, Mill Basin
- Congregation Beth Elohim, Park Slope
- Congregation Kolot Chayeinu, Park Slope
- Park Slope Jewish Center, Park Slope
- Beth Jacob Ohev Sholom, Williamsburg
- Yetev Lev D'Satmar, Hooper Street, Williamsburg
- Yetev Lev D'Satmar, Rodney Street, Williamsburg

On Long Island

- Jewish Center of Atlantic Beach, Atlantic Beach
- Jewish Center of the Hamptons, East Hampton
- East Meadow Beth-El Jewish Center, East Meadow
- North Country Reform Temple, Glen Cove
- Temple Beth-El, Great Neck
- Congregation Tifereth Israel, Greenport
- Jericho Jewish Center, Jericho
- Temple Emanu-El, Long Beach
- Reconstructionist Synagogue of the North Shore, Plandome
- Temple Beth Israel, Port Washington
- Temple Adas Israel, Sag Harbor
- Congregation Aish Kodesh, Woodmere

In Manhattan

- Meserich Synagogue, East Village
- Sixth Street Community Synagogue, East Village
- Congregation Beth Israel West Side Jewish Center, Hudson Yards
- Millinery Center Synagogue, Garment District
- Old Broadway Synagogue, Harlem
- The Actors' Temple, Hell's Kitchen
- Fort Tryon Jewish Center, Hudson Heights
- Lincoln Square Synagogue, Lincoln Square
- Bialystoker Synagogue, Lower East Side
- City Congregation for Humanistic Judaism, Lower East Side
- Congregation Chasam Sopher, Lower East Side
- Eldridge Street Synagogue, Lower East Side
- Kehila Kedosha Janina, Lower East Side
- The Shul of New York, Lower East Side
- Stanton Street Synagogue, Lower East Side
- Congregation Talmud Torah Adereth El, Lower East Side
- Lab/Shul, Lower West Side
- Congregation Beit Simchat Torah, Midtown
- Central Synagogue, Midtown
- Sutton Place Synagogue, Midtown
- TriBeCa Synagogue, Tribeca
- Congregation Emanu-El of New York
  - Temple Emanu-El of New York (1930), Upper East Side
- Fifth Avenue Synagogue, Upper East Side
- Temple Israel of the City of New York, Upper East Side
- Congregation Kehilath Jeshurun, Upper East Side
- Congregation Or Zarua, Upper East Side
- Park Avenue Synagogue, Upper East Side
- Park East Synagogue, Upper East Side
- Edmond J. Safra Synagogue, Upper East Side
- Temple Shaaray Tefila, Upper East Side
- Temple of Universal Judaism, Upper East Side
- Ansche Chesed, Upper West Side
- B'nai Jeshurun, Upper West Side
- Congregation Habonim, Upper West Side
- Jewish Center, Upper West Side
- Kol Zimrah, Upper West Side
- Ohab Zedek, Upper West Side
- Ramath Orah, Upper West Side
- Congregation Rodeph Sholom, Upper West Side
- Romemu, Upper West Side
- Congregation Shaare Zedek, Upper West Side
- Congregation Shearith Israel, Upper West Side
- Society for the Advancement of Judaism, Upper West Side
- Stephen Wise Free Synagogue, Upper West Side
- Hebrew Tabernacle of Washington Heights, Washington Heights
- K'hal Adath Jeshurun, Washington Heights
- Mount Sinai Jewish Center, Washington Heights

In Queens

- Astoria Center of Israel, Astoria
- Congregation Etz Hayim at Hollis Hills Bayside, Bayside
- Congregation Tifereth Israel, Corona
- Free Synagogue of Flushing, Flushing
- Congregation of Georgian Jews, Forest Hills
- Queens Jewish Center, Forest Hills
- Rego Park Jewish Center, Rego Park

Elsewhere in New York (state)

- Congregation Beth Emeth, Albany
- Beth David Synagogue, Amenia
- Temple Beth Zion, Buffalo
- Temple Beth El of Northern Westchester, Chappaqua
- Congregation Beth Shalom, Clifton Park
- Congregation B'nai Israel Synagogue, Fleischmanns
- Hunter Synagogue, Hunter
- Jericho Jewish Center, Jericho
- Kerhonkson Synagogue, Kerhonkson
- Agudas Achim Synagogue, Livingston Manor
- Loch Sheldrake Synagogue, Loch Sheldrake
- Chevro Ahavath Zion Synagogue, Monticello
- Hebrew Congregation of Mountaindale Synagogue, Mountaindale
- Eaton Family Residence-Jewish Center of Norwich
- Temple Beth Israel, Plattsburgh
- Temple Beth Tzedek, Amherst
- Congregation Kneses Tifereth Israel, Port Chester
- Temple B'rith Kodesh, Rochester
- Temple Emanu-El, Staten Island
- Anshei Glen Wild Synagogue, Sullivan County
- Bikur Cholim B'nai Israel Synagogue, Swan Lake
- Temple Society of Concord, Syracuse
- Congregation Berith Sholom, Troy
- Beth Joseph Synagogue, Tupper Lake
- Spring Glen Synagogue, Wawarsing
- Ulster Heights Synagogue, Wawarsing
- West Point Jewish Chapel, West Point (military academy)
- Temple Israel Center, White Plains
- B'nai Israel Synagogue, Woodbourne
- Ohave Shalom Synagogue, Woodridge
- Lincoln Park Jewish Center, Yonkers

==== Former synagogues ====
- Congregation Beth Emeth (former building), Albany, now Wilborn Temple First Church of God in Christ
- Temple of Israel, Amsterdam
- Chevra Linas Hazedek Synagogue of Harlem and the Bronx, the Bronx
- Mosholu Jewish Center, the Bronx
- Shaari Zedek Synagogue, Bedford-Stuyvesant, Brooklyn
- Jewish Center of Brighton Beach, Brighton Beach, Brooklyn
- Congregation Beth Israel, East Flatbush, Brooklyn
- Jewish Center of Kings Highway, Midwood, Brooklyn
- Young Israel of Flatbush, Midwood, Brooklyn
- Union Temple of Brooklyn, Prospect Heights, Brooklyn
- Jewish Center of Lake Huntington, Cochecton
- Anshei Glen Wild Synagogue, Glen Wild
- Temple Beth-El, Hornell
- Adath Jeshurun of Jassy Synagogue, Lower East Side, Manhattan
- Beth Hamedrash Hagodol, Lower East Side, Manhattan
- First Roumanian-American Congregation, Lower East Side, Manhattan
- Podhajcer Shul, Lower West Side, Manhattan
- Soho Synagogue, Soho, Manhattan
- Temple Beth-El (New York City), Upper East Side, Manhattan
- Temple Emanu-El (New York, 1868), Upper East Side, Manhattan
- Chevro Ahavath Zion Synagogue, Monticello
- Temple Beith Israel, Niagara Falls
- Temple B'Nai Israel, Olean
- Tefereth Israel Anshei Parksville Synagogue, Parkville
- Temple Beth El, Poughkeepsie, now Poughkeepsie Meeting House
- Congregation Ahavas Achim Anshi Austria, Rochester
- Leopold Street Shule, Rochester
- Temple of Israel Synagogue, Rockaway Beach
- South Fallsburg Hebrew Association Synagogue, South Fallsburg
- Temple Beth El, Syracuse
- Temple Beth-El, Tonawanda, now St. Bartholomew's Anglican Church
- Jewish Community Center of White Sulphur Springs, White Sulphur Springs

=== North Carolina ===
- Congregation Beth Israel, Asheville
- Temple Israel, Charlotte
- Temple Israel, Kinston
- Congregation Emanuel, Stateville
- Temple of Israel, Wilmington

==== Former synagogues ====
- Congregation Oheb Sholom, Goldsboro

=== North Dakota ===
- B'nai Israel Synagogue and Montefiore Cemetery, Grand Forks

=== Ohio ===
- Anshe Chesed Fairmount Temple, Beachwood
- Temple Tifereth-Israel, Beachwood
- Congregation Agudas Achim, Bexley
- Golf Manor Synagogue, Cincinnati
- Isaac M. Wise Temple, Cincinnati
- Rockdale Temple, Cincinnati
- Oheb Zedek Cedar Sinai Synagogue, Cleveland
- Park Synagogue, Pepper Pike
- Temple Israel, Columbus
- Temple Israel, Dayton
- Beth Israel Synagogue, Hamilton
- Congregation Beth Adam, Loveland
- Congregation B'nai Israel, Toledo

==== Former synagogues ====
- Akron Jewish Center, Akron
- Sherith Israel Temple, Cincinnati
- Temple B'nai Jeshurun, Cleveland, now the Shiloh Baptist Church
- The University Temple, Cleveland, now the Maltz Performing Arts Center

=== Oklahoma ===
- The Synagogue | Congregation B'nai Emunah, Tulsa
- Emanuel Synagogue, Oklahoma City
- Chabad Tulsa, Tulsa
- Chabad OKC, Oklahoma City
- Hillels of Oklahoma, Norman
- Temple B'nai Israel, Oklahoma City
- Temple Israel, Tulsa

=== Oregon ===
- Temple Beth Israel, Eugene
- Congregation Beth Israel, Portland
- Congregation Neveh Shalom, Portland
- Congregation Shaarie Torah, Portland

=== Pennsylvania ===
- Temple Beth Israel, Altoona
- Beth Israel Congregation of Chester County
- Congregation B'nai Shalom, Easton
- Temple Anshe Hesed, Erie
- Beth Shalom Congregation, Elkins Park
- Kesher Israel Congregation, Harrisburg
- Temple Ohev Sholom, Harrisburg
- Congregation Beth Israel, Honesdale
- Congregation Beth Israel, Lebanon
- Congregation Beth Or, Maple Glen
- Temple Adath Israel of the Main Line, Merion
- B'nai Jacob Synagogue, Middletown
- Beit Harambam Congregation, Philadelphia
- Temple Beth Zion-Beth Israel, Philadelphia
- Historic Congregation B'nai Abraham, Philadelphia
- Henry S. Frank Memorial Synagogue, Philadelphia
- Germantown Jewish Centre, Philadelphia
- Reform Congregation Keneseth Israel, Philadelphia
- Kol Tzedek, Philadelphia
- Congregation Mikveh Israel, Philadelphia
- Congregation Rodeph Shalom, Philadelphia
- Congregation Shivtei Yeshuron-Ezras Israel, Philadelphia
- Society Hill Synagogue, Philadelphia
- South Philadelphia Shtiebel, Philadelphia
- Vilna Congregation, Philadelphia
- YPC Shari-Eli (Philadelphia), Philadelphia
- Rodef Shalom Congregation, Pittsburgh
- Tree of Life – Or L'Simcha Congregation, Pittsburgh
- Kesher Zion, Reading
- Beth Israel Congregation, Washington
- Temple Beth Israel, York

==== Former synagogues ====
- Adath Shalom, Philadelphia
- B'nai Reuben Anshe Sfard, Philadelphia
- Neziner Congregation, Philadelphia
- Congregation B'nai Israel, Pittsburgh
- Temple Beth Israel, Sharon

=== Rhode Island ===
- Sons of Jacob Synagogue, Providence
- Temple Beth-El, Providence
- Touro Synagogue, Newport, the oldest surviving synagogue in North America

=== South Carolina ===
- Beth Israel Congregation, Beaufort
- Kahal Kadosh Beth Elohim, Charleston
- Beth Israel Congregation, Florence
- Temple Kol Ami, Fort Mill
- Temple Beth Elohim, Georgetown
- Temple Sinai, Sumter

==== Former synagogues ====
- House of Peace Synagogue, Columbia
- Old Beth Israel Synagogue, Greenville

=== Tennessee ===
- Temple Adas Israel, Brownsville
- Congregation Micah, Brentwood
- Mizpah Congregation, Chattanooga
- Temple B'Nai Israel, Jackson
- Baron Hirsch Synagogue, Memphis
- Temple Israel, Memphis
- Congregation Beit Tefilah Chabad, Nashville
- Congregation Ohabai Sholom, Nashville
- Congregation Sherith Israel, Nashville
- Kol Dodi, Nashville
- West End Synagogue, Nashville

=== Texas ===
- Congregation Agudas Achim, Austin
- Congregation Beth Israel, Austin
- Temple Emanuel, Beaumont
- B'nai Abraham Synagogue, Brenham
- Temple Emanu-El, Dallas
- Congregation Beth Jacob, Galveston
- Congregation B'nai Israel, Galveston
- Congregation Beth Israel, Houston
- Congregation Beth Yeshurun, Houston
- Temple Sinai, Houston
- Adat Chaverim, Plano
- Temple Beth-El, San Antonio

==== Former synagogues ====
- Temple Freda, Bryan
- Temple Beth-El, Corsicana
- Old Bnai Zion Synagogue, El Paso
- Congregation Shearith Israel, Wharton

=== Utah ===
- Congregation B'rith Sholem Synagogue, Ogden
- Congregation Kol Ami, Salt Lake City

==== Former synagogues ====
- B'nai Israel Temple, Salt Lake City
- Congregation Montefiore Synagogue, Salt Lake City, now Saints Peter and Paul Orthodox Christian Church
- Congregation Sharey Tzedek Synagogue, Salt Lake City

=== Vermont ===
- Ohavi Zedek, Burlington
- Old Ohavi Zedek Synagogue, Burlington, now occupied by Congregation Ahavath Gerim
- Rutland Jewish Center, Rutland

=== Virginia ===
- Agudas Achim Congregation, Alexandria
- Beth El Hebrew Congregation, Alexandria
- Congregation Beth Israel, Charlottesville
- Temple Rodef Shalom, Falls Church
- Temple Sinai, Newport News
- Commodore Levy Chapel, Norfolk
- Congregation Beth Ahabah, Richmond
- Congregation Kol Emes, Richmond
- Beth Israel Synagogue, Roanoke
- Temple House of Israel, Staunton
- Beth El Congregation, Winchester

==== Former synagogues ====
- Kahal Kadosh Beth Shalome, Richmond
- Temple Sinai, Portsmouth

=== Washington ===
- Congregation Beth Israel, Bellingham
- Bikur Cholim Machzikay Hadath, Seattle
- Temple De Hirsch Sinai, Seattle
- Congregation Ezra Bessaroth, Seattle
- Kavana Cooperative, Seattle
- Sephardic Bikur Holim Congregation, Seattle

==== Former synagogues ====
- Chevra Bikur Cholim, now the Langston Hughes Performing Arts Institute, Seattle
- Ohaveth Sholum Congregation, Seattle

=== West Virginia ===
- Ohev Sholom Temple, Huntington
- Temple Shalom, Wheeling
- B’nai Jacob, Charleston
- Temple Israel, Charleston

=== Wisconsin ===
- Temple Beth El, Madison
- Congregation Beth Israel Ner Tamid, Milwaukee
- Congregation Emanu-El B'ne Jeshurun, River Hills

==== Former synagogues ====
- Temple Zion and School, Appleton
- Gates of Heaven Synagogue, Madison

=== Wyoming ===
- Mt. Sinai Synagogue, Cheyenne

== See also ==
- List of the oldest synagogues in the United States
- List of Young Israel Synagogues
