= Beth El Congregation (Winchester, Virginia) =

Reform synagogue in Winchester, Virginia, US

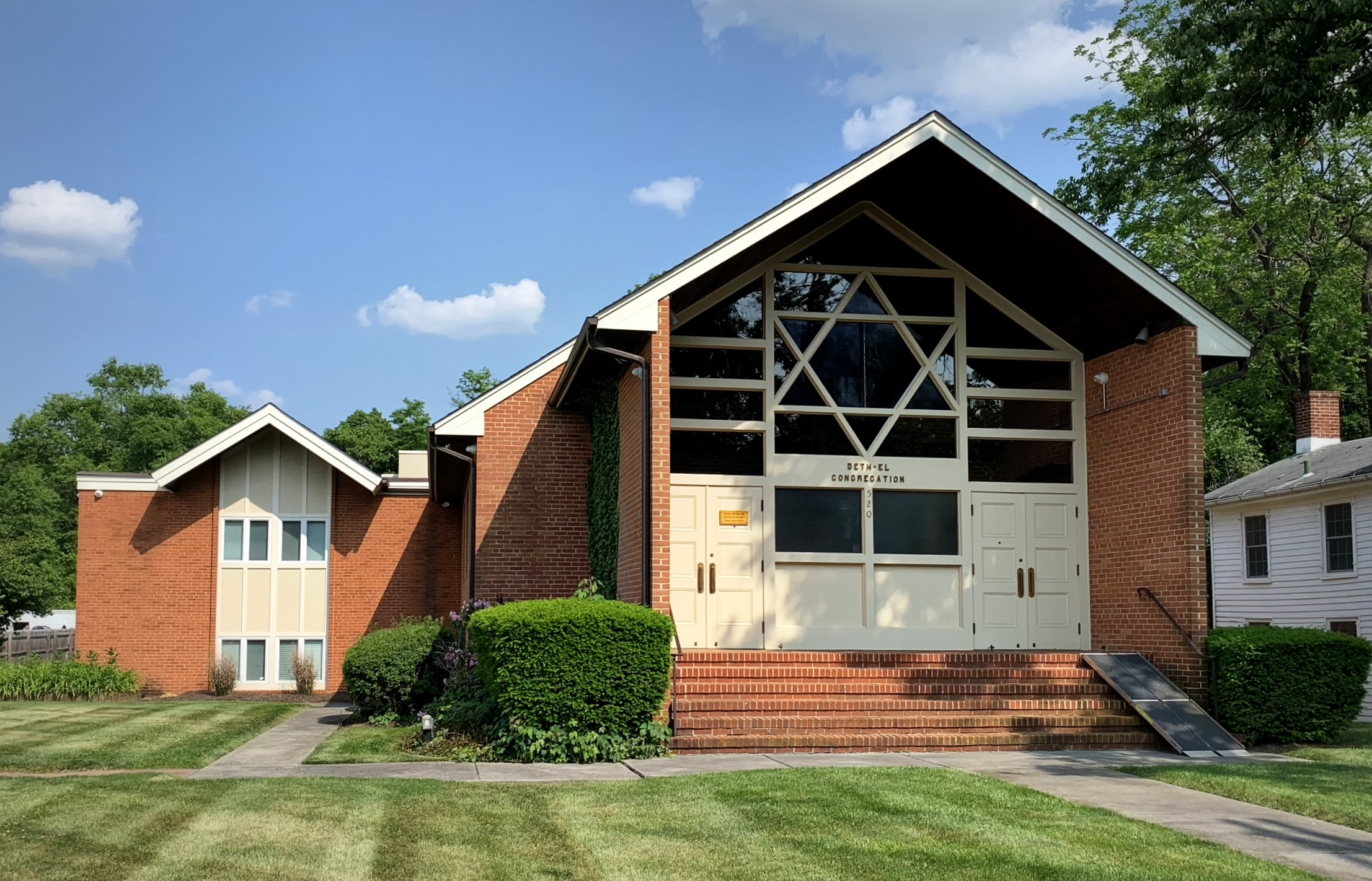
- Beth El Congregation synagogue in 2023

- Location in Virginia

Religion
- Affiliation: Reform Judaism
- Ecclesiastical or organisational status: Synagogue
- Leadership: Rabbi Aaron Stucker-Rozovsky
- Year consecrated: 1956
- Status: Active

Location
- Location: 520 Fairmont Avenue, Winchester, Virginia
- Country: United States
- Coordinates: 39°11′33″N 78°09′58″W

Architecture
- Established: 1930s (as a congregation)
- Completed: 1954
- Construction cost: $55,000

Website
- bethelcongregation.org

Beth El Congregation is a Reform Judaism congregation located at 520 Fairmont Avenue in Winchester, Virginia, in the United States. The local Jewish community developed in the late-19th century. They were mostly merchants who observed dietary laws (kosher), often having to travel to Baltimore for supplies. In 1908, the Jewish citizens decided to observe its first High Holy Days. Two local leaders learned shochet laws, enabling local Jews to keep kosher without having to travel out of town.

By the 1930s, there were over 50 Jews living in Winchester and another two dozen in nearby towns. During that decade, Beth El was formally established and the congregation met on the third floor of the Odd Fellows Building. The local Jewish Women's Club and B'nai B'rith Lodge were also established during that decade. Services were led by congregants until after World War II. By that time, many in the congregation no longer observed Orthodox practices, and Reform Judaism began to take hold. Rabbis studying at Hebrew Union College would come each year to conduct services during High Holy Days.

In 1954, a synagogue was built, allowing Beth El to have a permanent place to gather and worship. A dedication ceremony was attended by dignitaries including Representative Burr Harrison and Senator Harry F. Byrd. The local non-Jewish community played a major role in raising funds for the new synagogue, with over $12,000 in donations given to the congregation. This type of interfaith practice would continue throughout Beth El's history.

After the synagogue was built, there was a rotating number of rabbis leading services, but one cantor, Lloyd Robb, would remain for 40 years. In 1991, Beth El's first rabbi, Dan Isaac, was hired. A major renovation was undertaken beginning in 2013 to accommodate elderly and disabled attendees, move the sanctuary entrance to a new portion of the building, and to update the sanctuary and other rooms.

The current rabbi is Aaron Stucker-Rozovsky, who also holds the rank of major in the National Guard. He arrived during the COVID-19 pandemic, when services were held online and congregants would deliver groceries to the elderly. Other charitable activities Beth El participates in include hosting an annual Migrant's Lunch, volunteering at the local hospital on Christmas so that non-Jews may have the day off, and providing assistance to the Winchester Area Temporary Transitional Shelter. Prominent past and current members include Winchester Mayor Charles Zuckerman and Ron Kaplan, former CEO of Trex Company, Inc.

== History ==
=== Early history ===
The Jewish history of Winchester, Virginia, began during colonial times when a Jewish fur trader would visit the town to do business. During the Revolutionary War, a Jewish loyalist was in Winchester, where he provided food for British captives. According to a 1910 article in American Jewish Historical Quarterly, one of the members of the town's Masonic lodge in 1808 was a Jewish man named Lewis Barnett. It would be many years before a Jewish community would develop in Winchester. There were 19 Jews in Winchester by the late 1870s, many of whom were merchants, but the community slowly grew throughout the following decades. Some of the earlier families were the Hables, who arrived in 1872, the Hellers and Fineburgs in 1887, Rosenmyers in 1897, Novicks, Klompuses, and Finkelsteins in 1908–1909, and the Kramers in the 1910s.

By 1908, the community had grown large enough that Jewish services were held and the town's first High Holy Days was observed, thanks to a visit from Rabbi M. Paul and cantor Simon Lipstein. Early residents that observed kosher dietary laws would travel to Baltimore to buy kosher food, or a train was sent to deliver the food to Winchester. Philip Klompus and Philip Kramer, who were both leaders in the congregation, eventually learned the rules of kosher dietary laws and served as shochets for the community.

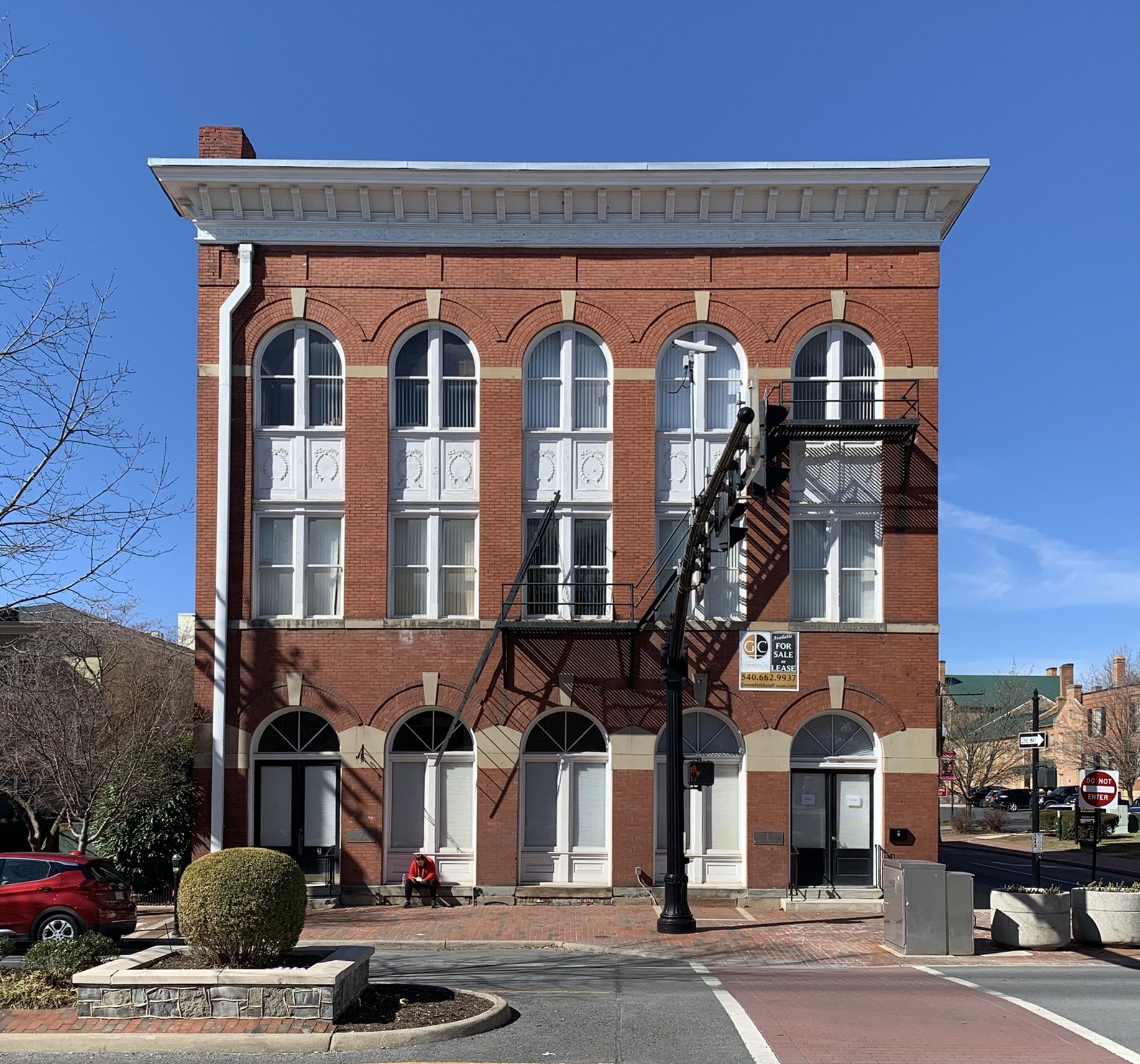
Beth El congregants held services at the Odd Fellows Hall during its early years.

Many of the earliest families, who had grown up in the Orthodox tradition and were mostly of Ashkenazi descent, had children who started successful merchant businesses in Winchester. One example is Herman Hable, who operated S.H., Hable's, served on the city council, and helped open the town's first movie theater, Palace Theater, where he also held concerts, contests, and other events. Patsy Cline, a native of Winchester, performed during these contests, helping to launch her career.

There were around 57 Jews living in Winchester by 1937 and over two dozen more in nearby Strasburg and Front Royal. Most of these people observed kosher laws. Despite the small number of the community, they began organizing Jewish groups. The Jewish Women's Club formed in 1931 would later be called the temple sisterhood and the Jewish Men's Club formed in 1932 the B'nai B'rith Lodge. It was during that same decade Beth El was created. The congregation met on the third floor of the Odd Fellows Hall on East Boscawen Street and Tessie Novick began holding Sunday School services in her home.

During the early years of the congregation, laymen and cantors would conduct services. The exception to this was during High Holy Days. Someone from a yeshiva would come to Winchester to perform the services in Hebrew. Services were not held every week, but minyans took place when needed and boys were sent out of town to study for their bar mitzvahs. After World War II, many of the younger generation began to stop keeping kosher. One of these people, future councilman and mayor Charles Zuckerman, stopped after his mother had died. During the 1940s, the congregation began observing Reform Judaism practices. In 1950, the congregation established its own Sunday School program. A few years later, the congregation began having Reform rabbis deliver services and it joined the Reform Union of American Hebrew Congregations (UAHC) in 1956. One of the congregants, Seymour Barr, served as president of the UHAC's Mid-Atlantic Council.

Congregants asked the Hebrew Union College (HUC) to send a Reform rabbi since the only members that still observed dietary laws were a few older people. The one sent, Rabbi Arthur Odds, had been raised Orthodox and was previously an ordained Orthodox rabbi. He was studying to be an ordained Reform rabbi, but when he arrived to Winchester, he still carried out Orthodox practices. The next rabbi sent was Jerome Gurland, who was also raised Orthodox but was studying to lead Reform services. The congregation liked him and he was asked to return monthly for the next three years and Gurland remained during construction of the synagogue.

=== Synagogue ===
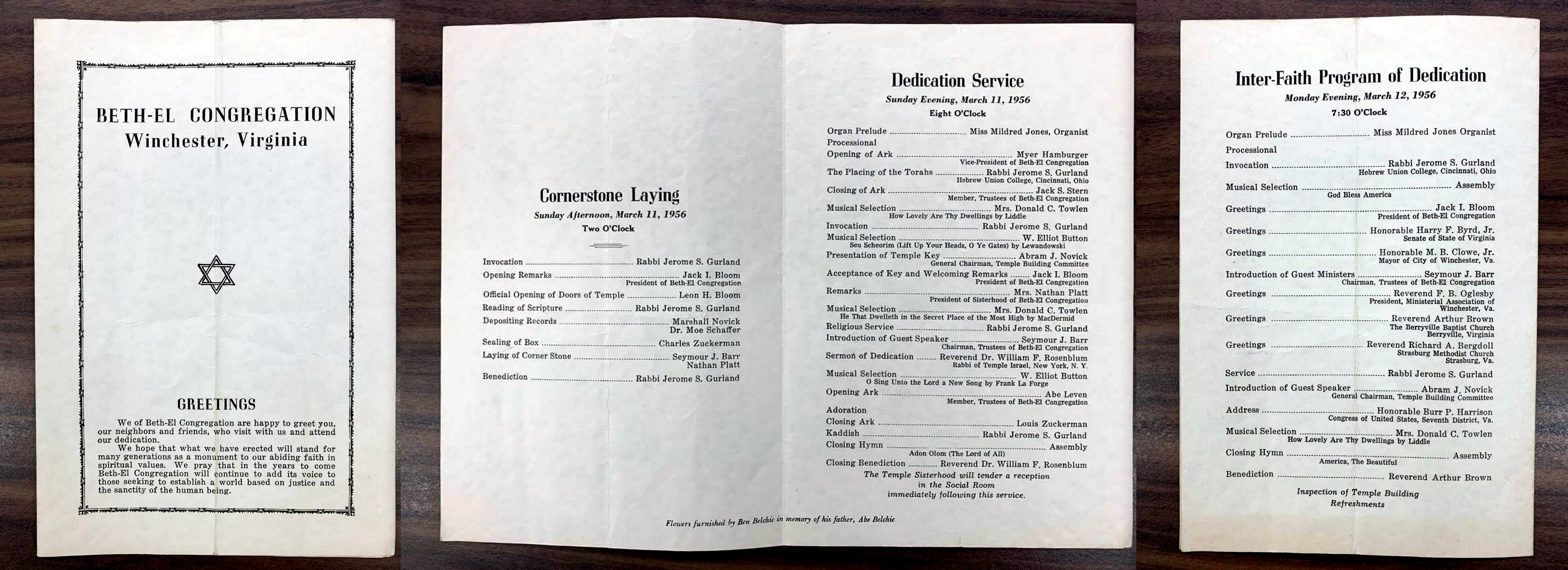
Pamphlet from the 1956 synagogue dedication

At a meeting on November 2, 1951, the congregation decided a synagogue was needed. The estimated cost of construction was $35,000 (equivalent to $434,100 in 2025). Then an architect was brought in who planned an extravagant building that would have been ten times as expensive, if not more. Congregants decided to significantly scale down his design for a building on Fairmont Avenue. Work on the site began in April 1954 and a groundbreaking ceremony took place on May 30, 1954.

According to Beth El congregants, Jews had always been very accepted in the community. When the congregation was trying to raise funds for the new synagogue, Jerry Novick and the fundraising committee received over $12,000 (equivalent to $148,800 in 2025) from non-Jews in the area. A dedication ceremony took place on May 11 and 12, 1956. On the first day, traditional services were held, led by Gurland. An interfaith program took place on the second day, attended by local Christian ministers and politicians. Among them were Representative Burr Harrison and Senator Harry F. Byrd, both of whom spoke at the event. On reporting the dedication, an article in The Winchester Star stated: "The Star is proud of the splendid Jewish citizens of this community. We share with them pride in the erection of the Beth-El Temple."

=== Later history ===
After the synagogue was completed, the number of congregants grew rapidly, most of whom were involved in merchant businesses. There were 105 Jewish families, including 60 children, at Beth El's peak attendance. Rabbi Steve Arnold led the congregation for two years, followed by Rabbi Norbert M. Samuelson. During Samuelson's time as rabbi, a two-story educational wing paid for by the Novick family was added to the synagogue in 1961 due to the congregation's large number of children at the time. HUC rabbis that followed were Bernard Mehlman, Richard Lahrman, and Hank Zoob. The congregation's first ordained rabbi to conduct services was Saul Besser, who split his time between Beth El and being director of the Mid-Atlantic Council. He only stayed for one year before Rabbi Davis arrived, who also stayed one year. Rabbi Messing led the congregation for three years followed by Rabbi Schoolman, who stayed less than one year.

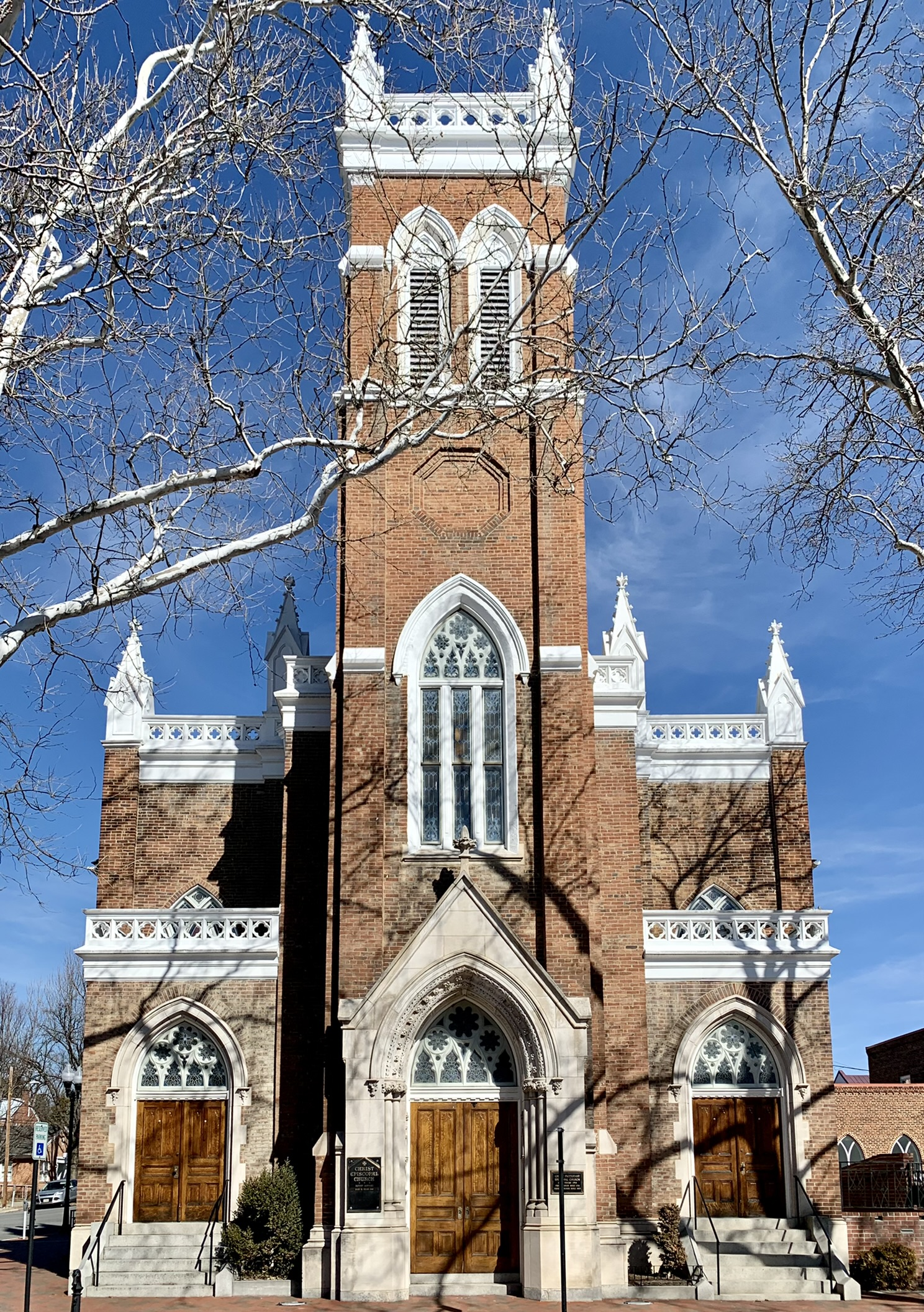
Christ Episcopal Church is one of the local churches to participate in interfaith events with Beth El.

During the 1960s, there was a gradual decline in membership, but a continued interfaith dialogue between Beth El and churches in Winchester, including a visit by Reverend Baden of Christ Episcopal Church, who attended a Passover Seder, after which congregants were invited to watch a Eucharist service. Around the same time, Beth El was led by a rotating number of rabbis from the Washington, D.C., area, including then-director of the Mid-Atlantic Council, Rabbi Sternberger.

After the rotation ended, Rabbi Frank Waldorf led the congregation for the next several years in the 1970s. Beth El bought a portion of the Shenandoah Memorial Park cemetery during this time. Before then, members were buried in Martinsburg, West Virginia, where the closest Jewish cemetery was located, or in Baltimore. Members who held public office during this time included Charles Zuckerman on the city council (and later as mayor from 1980 to 1988), David Scheer as mayor of Romney, West Virginia, Sam Zuckerman on the Front Royal town council, Charles Platt on the Strasburg town council, and Lee Lovett, who was Stephens City's town attorney.

It was not until 1991 when Beth El hired its first rabbi, Dan Isaac. After Robb, Beth El was led by rabbis Milton Richman, Zari Weiss, Howard Folb, Amy Scheinerman, Garson Herzfeld, and Jonathan Brown, the latter serving as rabbi from 2004 to 2010. Lloyd Robb, who taught at Shenandoah University, began serving as cantor in 1965, a role he continued until 2005. In 2004, during the synagogue's 50th anniversary, Beth El's Torah was repaired by Menachem Young, a process that took 11 months. To assist him, 80 members each filled in a letter so that the entire congregation could take part in the restoration. The Torah, believed to have been written by a scribe from the Austro-Hungarian Empire, was given to Beth El in 1936 by the Wise family.

By the mid-2000s, the synagogue was in need of updates and a renovation, including addressing ADA concerns like older members having to climb stairs to reach the restrooms. A decision was made between updating the current building or erecting a new synagogue. The congregation chose to not demolish. Renovation plans included three phases: installing an elevator, renovating the ground level, and renovating the sanctuary level. The estimated cost to do all of this was $1–2 million. As an example of the good relationship between Beth El and the community, fundraisers took place, attended by locals and congregants.

In 2010, Rabbi Scott Sperling was hired and his love of music played a large role in his time at Beth El. In an interview, Sperling noted Beth El was adherent to Progressive Judaism and committed "to being an inclusive congregation." Renovation began in 2013, after city officials approved a design whereby a 30-foot (9.1 m) addition to the rear the synagogue would be built, where the elevators and a new entrance would be placed. The entrance to the synagogue was moved to the rear of the building. While work was being done on the synagogue, services were held at Braddock Street United Methodist Church.

Rabbi Sperling retired in 2016 and Rabbi Peter Grumbacher, father of Beth El's president, began serving on an interim basis. When Grumbacher was out of town for prior engagements, Rabbi Michael Kramer led services. An event held by Grumbacher included the story of his father, who was arrested during Kristallnacht and imprisoned at the Dachau concentration camp. The event was similar to his "Sharing the Silence" presentation that he gave at many locations throughout the United States. Former Ambassador to Bulgaria, Hugh Kenneth Hill, also spoke to the congregation and non-Jews about how Bulgaria was able to save some of its Jewish people.

In 2018, Rabbi Sperling came out of retirement to once again lead Beth El. Only a couple of months after his retirement began, Sperling began working as an interim rabbi in Maryland, but decided to return to Beth El. By this time the congregation had three Torahs, one rescued from Poland during the Nazi occupation. As a way to reach out to the community, each year Sperling would open the synagogue to non-Jews to explain "key elements of Judaism and [answer] questions about the religion's beliefs and practices." Congregation leaders thought it was more important than ever to reach out to locals after the Pittsburgh synagogue shooting. In response to increased antisemitic attacks in the U.S., security enhancements including a video system and fortified doors were installed in Beth El.

Beth El partnered with the Goldring/Woldenberg Institute of Southern Jewish Life in 2019. The organization hosted events and brought speakers to the congregation, along with letting Beth El use its Sunday School curriculum. That same year the final phase of the renovations took place when the social hall was updated and security measures, including more lighting and shatter-resistant windows, were added due to rising antisemitism in the United States. During the COVID-19 pandemic, congregation leaders canceled Thursday nights' Passover Seder and began holding services via Zoom in March 2020. Members began visiting older people who needed assistance with food deliveries. In August 2020, Rabbi Aaron Stucker-Rozovsky was hired by the congregation. Stucker-Rozovsky is a chaplain with the rank of lieutenant colonel in the Virginia National Guard.

Some of the activities held at Beth El, which is the only synagogue within 50 miles (80 km) of Winchester and includes around 95 families, include gathering for a Hanukkah dinner each year, teaching children about Purim by baking hamantashen, holding fundraisers at the local Alamo Drafthouse Cinema with showings of Fiddler on the Roof, hosting an annual Migrant's Lunch, assisting with events at the Winchester Area Temporary Transitional Shelter, and volunteering at Winchester Medical Center on Christmas in an event called Operation Snowflake, whereby non-Jews can have the day off.

== See also ==
- List of synagogues in the United States
