= Magen David Synagogue =

Magen David Synagogue may refer to:

- Magen David Synagogue (Brooklyn), New York, U.S.
- Magen David Synagogue (Byculla), Mumbai, India
- Magen David Synagogue (Kolkata), India

== See also ==
- Magen David Sephardic Congregation, North Bethesda, Maryland, U.S.
- Maguen David Synagogue, San Pedro Sula, Honduras
