= Temple Beth Tzedek =

Conservative synagogue in New York (state)

- Hebrew: קהלה קדשה בית צדק
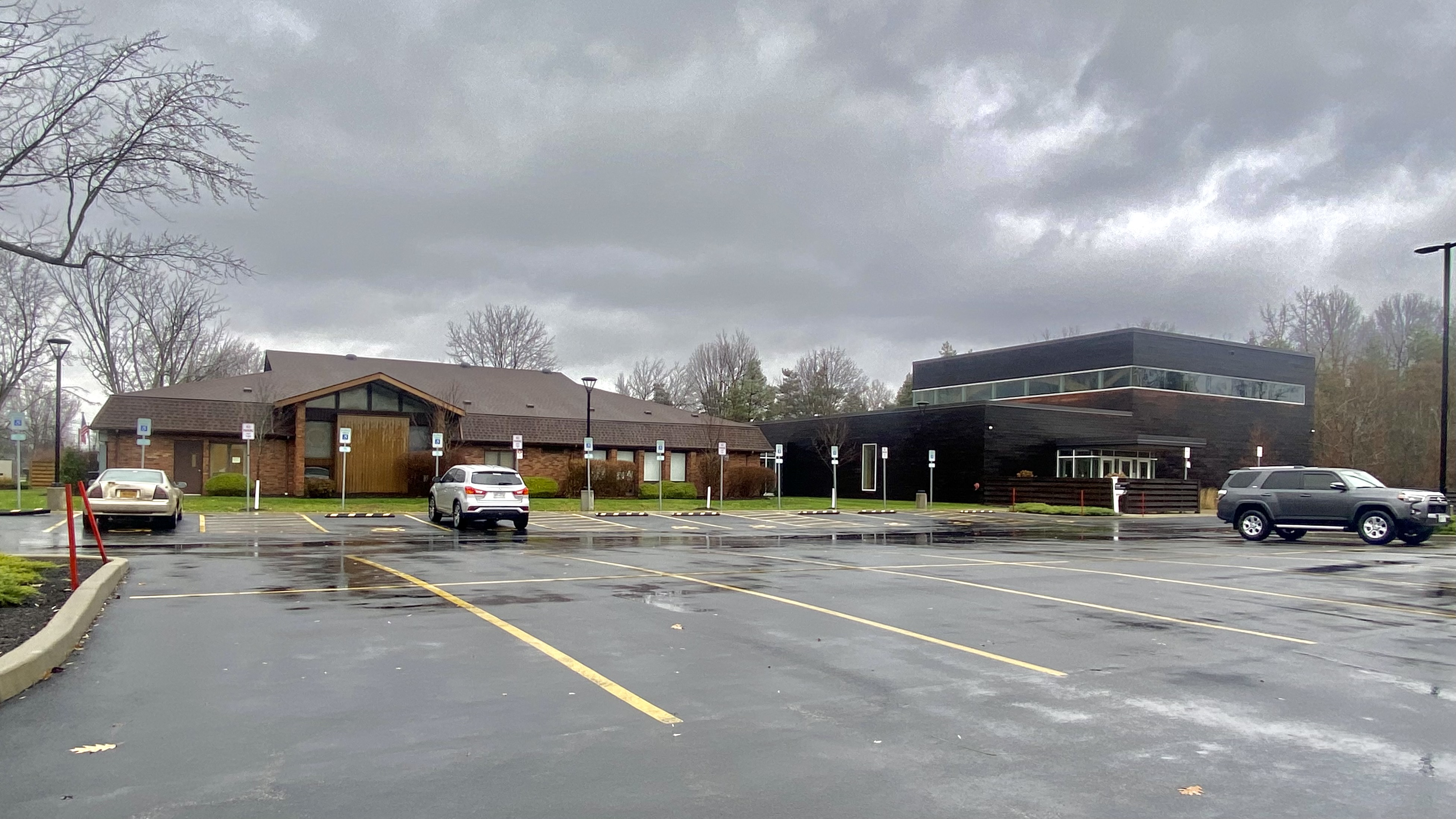
- The synagogue in 2022

- Location of the synagogue in New York

Religion
- Affiliation: Conservative Judaism
- Region: Buffalo, New York
- Rite: Nusach Ashkenaz
- Ecclesiastical or organisational status: Synagogue
- Leadership: Rabbi Sara Rich
- Status: Active

Location
- Location: Amherst, New York, Western New York, New York
- State: New York
- Country: United States
- Coordinates: 43°0′3″N 78°45′37″W

Architecture
- Established: 2008 (as a congregation)
- Completed: 2018

Website
- btzbuffalo.org

Temple Beth Tzedek (Hebrew: קהלה קדשה בית צדק, romanized: mqḏš ḇyṯ ṣḏq) is a Conservative Jewish congregation and synagogue, located in the Buffalo suburb of Amherst, in Western New York, in the state of New York, in the United States. A pillar of the local Jewish community, the synagogue is the second-largest one in Buffalo and the region's flagship for the United Synagogue of Conservative Judaism, which represents 600 congregations across North America.

== History ==
The congregation was formed in 2008 through the merger of two congregations, named Temple Beth El, Buffalo's oldest synagogue per its founding in 1847, and Temple Shaarey Zedek. Rabbi Sara Rich was appointed the senior rabbi of the congregation in 2023. Cantor Mark Spindler served as the synagogue's cantor from 1987 until his retirement in the summer of 2026.

The new building for the synagogue was completed in 2018 by Finegold Alexander Architects and CannonDesign. It was the final synagogue designed by the prominent architect Maurice N. Finegold. The building had a more naturalistic look with glass emitting sunlight every day in the main sanctuary with the heavy use of timber and other wood materials to make it more nature-like and evoke the wooden synagogues of pre-World War II Eastern Europe. The facilities architectural design earned it a Brick by Brick Award for Excellence in Construction from Buffalo Business First in 2019.

In 2024, Temple Beth Tzedek was one of the first places of worship in the world to receive universal design certification for their improvement of accessibility for the disabled. The project was led by Harvey Sanders, the chairman of the synagogue's Project Beit Tfilah committee and Ed Steinfeld, a SUNY Distinguished Professor and the founder of the University at Buffalo's Center for Inclusive Design and Environmental Access.

== See also ==
- History of the Jews in New York
- List of synagogues in New York (state)
