= Congregation Etz Ahaim Sephardic =

Sephardic Orthodox synagogue in Highland Park, New Jersey

- Hebrew: קהילת קודש עץ החיים
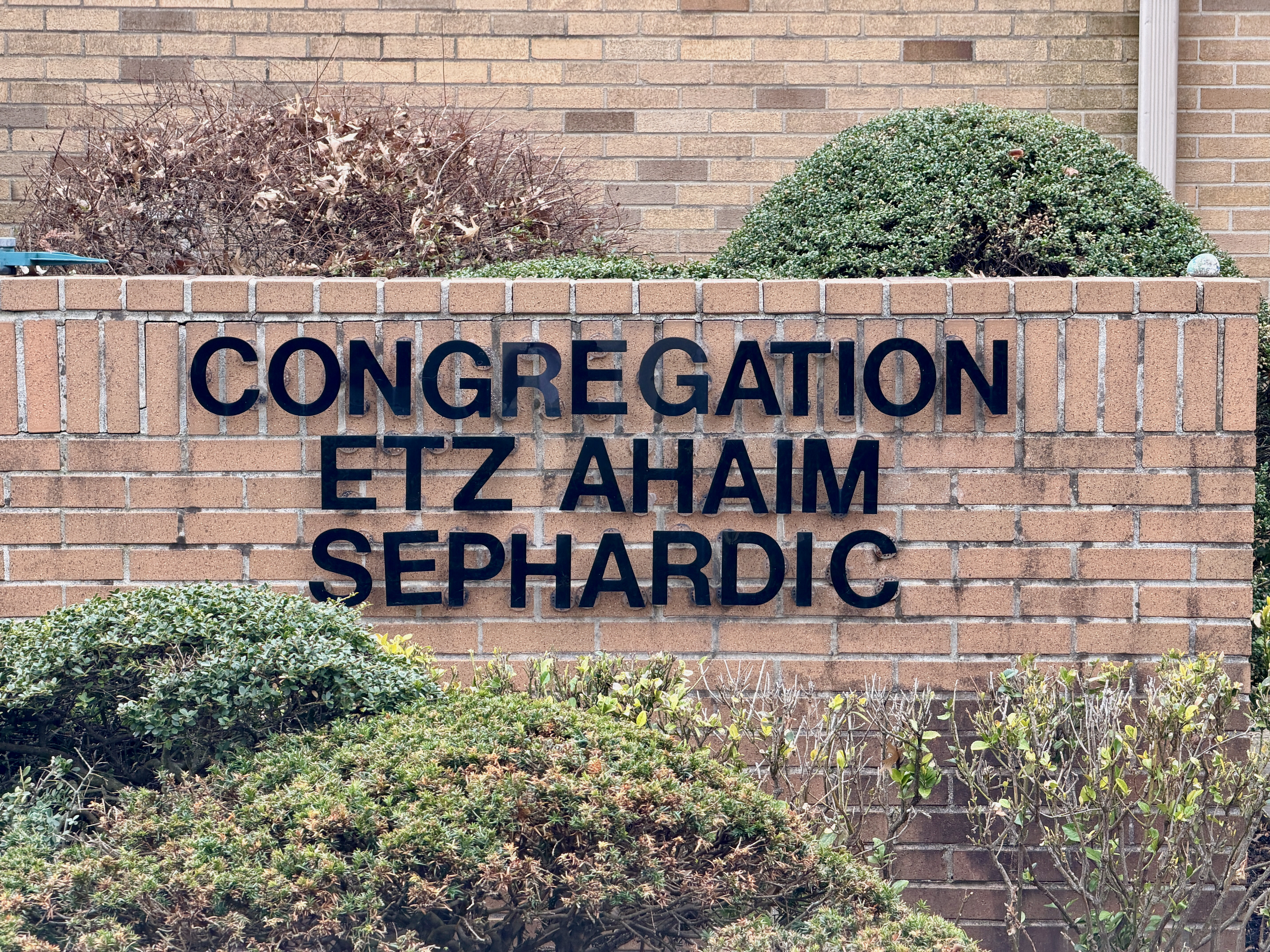
- Congregation Etz Ahaim Sephardic

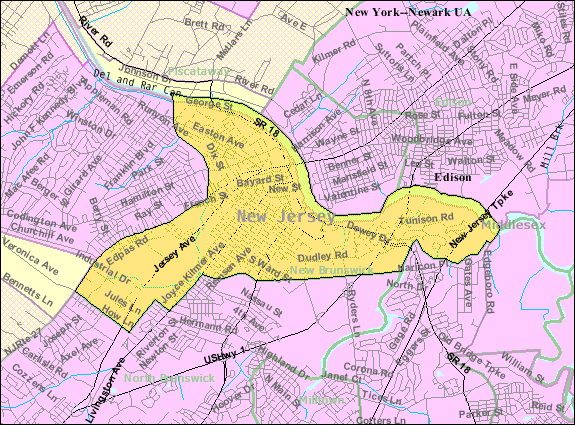
- Location near New Brunswick

Religion
- Affiliation: Orthodox Judaism
- Rite: Sephardi
- Ecclesiastical or organisational status: Synagogue
- Leadership: Rabbi Eliyahu Tal
- Status: Active

Location
- Location: 230 Denison Street, Highland Park, New Jersey
- Country: United States
- Administration: American Sephardi Federation
- Coordinates: 40°29′58″N 74°25′45″W

Architecture
- Type: Synagogue
- Style: Mid-century modern
- Funded by: Harry A. Naar
- Established: 1921 (as a congregation)
- Groundbreaking: May 15, 1960
- Completed: 1962

Specifications
- Direction of façade: Northwest
- Materials: Brick, wood

Website
- www.etzahaim.org

Congregation Etz Ahaim Sephardic (Hebrew: קהילת קודש עץ החיים, lit. 'The Tree of Life') is a Sephardic Orthodox synagogue located on Denison Street in Highland Park, New Jersey, in the United States. The congregation is a member of the American Sephardi Federation, the Sephardic Jewish Brotherhood of America (La Ermandad Sefaradi) and the Raritan Valley Orthodox Jewish Community Organization (ROCNJ). It is the only Sephardic congregation in Highland Park/Edison area.

The congregation consists of approximately 80 families. Its members and supporters have roots in Israel, Spain, Greece, Turkey, Syria, Europe, North Africa, Persia, Iraq and the United States. Prayers are offered in Hebrew, English and Ladino. It is the oldest Sephardic Jewish congregation in New Jersey.

== History ==
Jewish immigrants from Salonika, Greece, Turkey and the Balkans settled in the New Brunswick, New Jersey area in the early 20th century. The congregation was originally organized in September 1916 and incorporated on June 27, 1921. However, the original congregation apparently dissolved. In the late 1920s, the congregation was reorganized into "Congregation Es Ahaim Sepharedith" (The Tree of Life), named after the oldest synagogue in Salonica, Greece, Ets ha Chaim. The Congregation was re-founded on March 12, 1927, and incorporated on April 3, 1927. In 1928, when ground was broken for the original synagogue building on July 1, it was the only Sephardic synagogue in New Jersey. The synagogue was on Richmond Street, in the Hiram Market neighborhood of New Brunswick. The name of the congregation was later officially changed to Congregation Etz Ahaim. The congregation moved to its current location in Highland Park in 1962.

The current synagogue was built in 1962, mainly of brick. The building is beautified with Jewish motifs, such as the Tree of Life carved into the wooden front door, two metal seven-branched menorahs on the front wall of the main sanctuary and the Torah Ark היכל with wooden doors carved with a Tree of Life. Tiffany-style stained glass windows in the dome above the main sanctuary bathe the space in rich, radiant colors. The windows form two themes: Jewish Holidays and The Tribes of Israel. It seats 88 in the men's section, and 60 in the women's section, with a wooden mechitza topped with glass. On High Holy Days, the seating is expanded to accommodate 240 people.

== Activities ==
Daily prayer services are held mornings and evenings. Minyans on Shabbat number 100 people on a weekly basis. Shabbat Shacharit services are followed by a sit-down kiddush.

Child care and a children's program are offered on Shabbat and Yom Tov. Congregation Etz Ahaim organizes community outreach, philosophy classes and adult education.

It also has an active Sisterhood, the Daughters of Etz Ahaim, as old as the congregation itself. The Sisterhood has organized a cookbook, fundraising activities for the Congregation, food on Yom Tov, Purim baskets, and other activities which support and enhance life in the community.

Highland Park has New Jersey's first eruv. Congregation Etz Ahaim is located inside the eruv. Highland Park has a mikvah.

== Cemeteries ==
The Congregation maintains two cemeteries. One, shared with Congregation Poile Zedek, is in New Brunswick. The other, Floral Park Cemetery, is in South Brunswick, New Jersey.

Some members of the congregation are buried at the Sephardic Jewish Brotherhood section at Elmwood Cemetery in North Brunswick, New Jersey.

=== 2008 cemetery vandalism ===
In January 2008, almost 500 gravestones in the cemetery which Congregation Etz Ahaim shared with Congregation Poile Zedek were damaged in an incident of vandalism.

== Clergy ==
Founded at the start of the Great Depression, the congregation was unable to afford a rabbi. They relied on the uncompensated services of Rabbi Benjamin Naar of Salonica, and on unordained lay leaders Eliyahu Nahama and Elie Saporta until 1955. After that, Congregation Etz Ahaim was led by Rabbis Ishmael Cohen, Murray Greenfield, Rafael Wizman, David Glicksman, and Yamin Levy.

Starting in 1991, Rabbi David Bassous was its spiritual leader. Prior to joining Etz Ahaim, Rabbi Bassous was spiritual leader of Congregation Beth Hamidrash in Vancouver, Canada. Born in Calcutta and of Iraqi descent, Rabbi Bassous studied in London for an engineering degree and in Israel for his religious training. He led Congregation Etz Ahaim for almost 30 years. Rabbi Bassous retired in 2020 and made aliyah.

The congregation's current spiritual leader is Rabbi Eliyahu Tal (Hebrew: רב אליהו טל). He was born in London and lived most of his life in Israel. Before joining Congregation Etz Ahaim in 2020, he had served since 2017 as the rabbi of the Sephardic Orthodox Congregation Beit Mordechai in West Hartford, Connecticut.

== See also ==
- List of Orthodox Jewish communities in the United States
- List of synagogues in the United States
- Floral Park Cemetery
- Poile Zedek Synagogue
