= Beit Harambam Congregation =

Synagogue in Philadelphia, Pennsylvania, United States

- Hebrew: בית הרמב"ם
- Location in Philadelphia

Religion
- Affiliation: Orthodox Judaism
- Rite: Edot HaMizrach
- Ecclesiastical or organizational status: Synagogue
- Leadership: Rabbi Amiram Gabay; Rabbi Moshe Haim Arbiv (Assistant)
- Status: Active

Location
- Location: 9981 Verree Road, Philadelphia, Pennsylvania
- Country: United States
- Interactive map of Beit Harambam Congregation
- Coordinates: 40°06′14″N 75°02′06″W

Architecture
- Established: 1978 (as a congregation)
- Completed: 1980s; 2002 (after arson attack)

Beit Harambam Congregation (Hebrew: בית הרמב"ם, lit. 'House of the Rambam') is a Sephardi Orthodox Jewish congregation and synagogue, located in Northeast Philadelphia, Pennsylvania, in the United States. Founded in 1978, its membership is largely composed of Hebrew-speaking Israeli expatriates. Started as a basement minyan, the congregation purchased a small home in the 1980s, which was subsequently destroyed by arson in 2000. With significant funding from the Philadelphia Jewish community, the building was restored. The synagogue was further expanded with a larger sanctuary and a social hall, completed in 2011.

== Name ==
The congregation is named in honor of Maimonides, a 12th-century Sephardi scholar, philosopher, and halakhic decisor known by the acronym of his name, Rav Moshe Ben Maimon, as the Rambam.

== History ==
Beit Harambam Congregation was founded in 1978 as a Sephardi minyan by Rabbi Amiram Gabay in the basement of his house in the Rhawnhurst neighborhood of Northeast Philadelphia. Gabay is a long-time owner of a Judaica gift shop and art gallery in Philadelphia and also serves as a police chaplain. A native of Morocco who had lived briefly in Israel, Gabay sought to provide a place of worship for Hebrew-speaking Israeli expatriates in the community.

The congregation grew gradually, and members were able to buy a small house in which to hold services in the late 1980s. The furnishings, collected over time, included a simple wooden Torah ark, a long table and chairs for study sessions, and an assortment of bookshelves.

By 2000, the congregation had 300 members. In 2013, an estimated 250 to 300 individuals were active in the synagogue. As of 2013, Beit Harambam Congregation was the larger of two Sephardi synagogues in Northeast Philadelphia.

=== Arson attack ===
On Shabbat, May 27, 2000, worshippers arriving for morning prayers found the synagogue gutted by fire. According to police, an arsonist had gained access to the interior through a back window, gathered up all the prayer books in a pile, and put a match to them. The fire was lit at around 4:20 a.m. The arsonist dropped two charity boxes in the yard during his escape.

Besides fire damage to the interior, half of the roof fell down. Firemen excavated four Torah scrolls which were "likely damaged beyond repair by smoke and water", and all of the synagogue's prayer books were rendered unusable. Fifty prayer shawls were also destroyed. The damaged Torah scrolls, prayer shawls, and other ritual objects were formally buried in August on the solemn mourning day of Tisha B'Av. Police posted a $10,000 reward for identification of the perpetrator, but no one was ever arrested.

The synagogue immediately began receiving support and funding from local and national groups and individuals. The American Jewish Congress donated $3,000 in June, which was earmarked for the purchase of new bibles and prayer books. The congregation received significant funding from the Philadelphia Jewish community, including the Jewish Federal of Greater Philadelphia, to rebuild. By 2002, the building had been restored.

With the growth of membership and activities, however, the congregation sought to expand its space. After a multi-year rezoning effort, the synagogue received the go-ahead to build a larger sanctuary and a social hall. As many members were skilled contractors or had jobs in the construction industry, they contributed their time and labor to the project. The expansion was completed in 2011 and was dedicated in 2012 in a ceremony attended by then-Sephardic Chief Rabbi of Israel Shlomo Amar.

=== Other incidents ===
Nearly a year after the fire, vandalism was discovered on the synagogue's interior walls—including "swastikas, obscenities and dollar signs". The synagogue was in the process of reconstruction and members were conducting services in a rented storefront.

== Leadership ==
Rabbi Amiram Gabay has led the congregation since its founding. His son, Eli Gabay, serves as president of the congregation. In 2009, Rabbi Moshe Haim Arbiv was hired as assistant rabbi to help cultivate new members. Arbiv and his wife Leah had been doing outreach work with Israelis living in Philadelphia for several years through the Shehebar Sephardic Center of Jerusalem.

== Synagogue activities ==
Beit Harambam Congregation is an Orthodox synagogue. The prayer service follows the nusach of Edot HaMizrach.

The synagogue offers daily study sessions for men, weekly Tehillim groups for women, and classes and activities for children. Assistant rabbi Moshe Haim Arbiv leads classes at 5:30 a.m. before morning prayers and also after evening prayers. Arbiv and his wife Leah have also introduced pre-holiday workshops, holiday parties, and social events both in the synagogue and in neighborhood parks. The Arbivs were involved in the successful installation of an eruv for the community, and have also launched social services such as a gemach (free-loan society), meals for the sick, and help for new mothers.

== Membership ==
As of 2019, the majority of members are Hebrew-speaking Israeli expatriates. Most members are of Mizrahi descent (including Kurdish, Libyan, Iraqi, and Moroccan), although some are Ashkenazi. According to The Philadelphia Inquirer, in 2000 there were no membership dues and the leadership of the congregation did not receive a salary.

== See also ==
- History of the Jews in Pennsylvania
