= Chevra Anshei Lubawitz of Borough Park =

Historic Orthodox synagogue in Brooklyn, New York

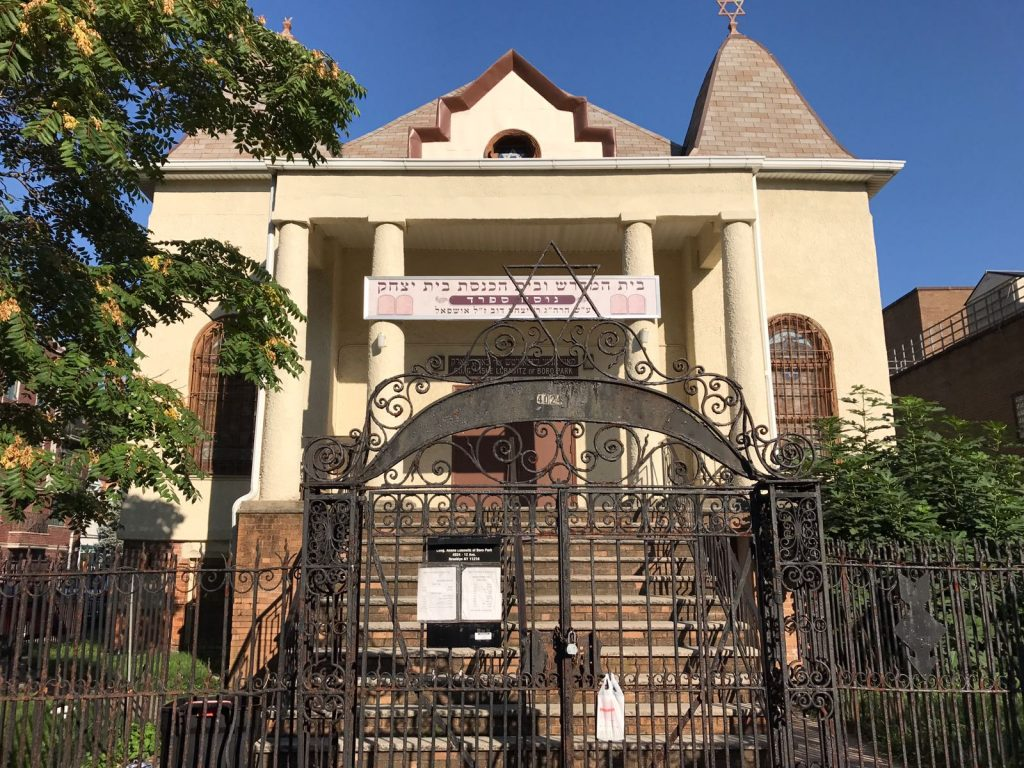
- The synagogue entrance, in 2017

- Location in New York City

Religion
- Affiliation: Orthodox Judaism
- Rite: Chabad Lubavitch
- Ecclesiastical or organisational status: Synagogue
- Status: Demolished

Location
- Location: 4024 12th Avenue, Borough Park, Brooklyn, New York City, New York 11219
- Country: United States
- Coordinates: 40°38′28″N 73°59′23″W

Architecture
- Architect: John C. Walsh
- Type: Synagogue architecture
- Style: Moorish Revival
- General contractor: Vito De Fino
- Established: 1902 (as Congregation Beth El); 1914 (as Anshei Lubawitz)
- Completed: 1907 (for Congregation Beth El)

Chevra Anshei Lubawitz of Borough Park was a historic Orthodox Jewish congregation and synagogue at 4024 12th Avenue in the Borough Park neighborhood of Brooklyn in New York City, New York, United States.

Built for Congregation Beth El in 1907, it was the first built and oldest synagogue in Borough Park. It was demolished in 2024.

== History ==
The building was erected by Congregation Beth El of Borough Park in 1907. On June 11, 1906, the Brooklyn Daily Eagle reported the cornerstone laying "Borough President Bird S. Coler was the principal speaker at the ceremonies attending the laying of the cornerstone of the Temple Beth El which is being erected at Twelfth avenue and Forty-first street, yesterday afternoon." Designed by John C. Walsh in the Moorish Revival style, the building is a modest “tenement synagogue” and is one of the two oldest surviving purpose-built synagogues in its borough in use.

Founded as Chevra Anshei Lubawitz Nusach Ha'ari of Borough Park (Note: Also, Chevra Anshei Lubawitz Nusach HoAri of Boro Park.) in 1914, in 1922 the synagogue building was sold to Chevra Anshei Lubawitz of Borough Park.

=== Demolition ===
The building and land were sold for $3.1 million in 2017 to a property developer who planned to demolish the building and build a six-story condominium building with a new synagogue on the first floor and basement. However, in August 2017 a judge temporarily blocked its demolition after members argued the sale of the building was based on misrepresentations. In November 2017, a preliminary injunction was issued, that remained in effect until October 2019. The doors of the synagogue were locked in January 2018. In March 2019, several members of the congregation lodged an application to the New York City Landmark Preservation Commission for "city landmark status". The building was demolished on March 17, 2024, even though workers did not have permits to raze the synagogue. A stop-work order was issued after the demolition.
