= Norbert M. Samuelson =

Scholar and professor of Jewish philosophy (1936–2022)

- Born: Norbert Max Samuelson; February 15, 1936; Chicago, Illinois, U.S.
- Died: May 9, 2022 (aged 86); Chicago, Illinois, U.S.

Academic work
- Main interests: Jewish philosophy Philosophy and religion Philosophy and science Jewish Aristotelians
- Notable works: Gersonides on God's knowledge (1977)

Norbert Max Samuelson (February 15, 1936 – May 9, 2022) was an American scholar of Jewish philosophy. He was professor emeritus at Arizona State University, having held the Grossman Chair of Jewish Studies there. He wrote 13 books and over 200 articles, with research interests in Jewish philosophy, philosophy and religion, philosophy and science, 20th-century philosophy (with an emphasis on Alfred North Whitehead and Franz Rosenzweig), and Jewish Aristotelians with an emphasis on Gersonides (Levi Ben Gershom); he also lectured at university-level conferences around the world.

== Academic biography ==
=== Education ===
Samuelson earned his bachelor's degree at Northwestern University in 1957. He then attended the Hebrew Union College – Jewish Institute of Religion, where he earned his Bachelor of Hebrew Letters in 1959 and his Master of Hebrew Letters and rabbinic ordination in 1962. He received his doctorate at Indiana University Bloomington in 1970, writing his dissertation on "The Problem of God's Knowledge in Gersonides – A Translation of and Commentary to Book III of the Milhamot Adonai (The Wars of the Lord)". His dissertation advisers were Shlomo Pines of the Hebrew University of Jerusalem and Milton Fisk of Indiana University.

He was Hillel director at Indiana University from 1962 to 1967 and at Princeton University from 1968 to 1973.

=== Academic positions ===
From 1963 to 1967, Samuelson was a teaching assistant in the philosophy department at Indiana University. He was a visiting lecturer in the philosophy department at Brooklyn College from 1969 to 1970 and a visiting associate professor in the Hebraic Studies department at Rutgers University from 1969 to 1973.

From 1973 to 1975, Samuelson was on the faculty of the University of Virginia Department of Religious Studies as an assistant professor. Beginning in 1975, he was an associate professor in the Religion Department at Temple University; in 1987 he became a full professor, and continued in this position until 1998. At that point he moved to Arizona State University, where he became the Harold and Jean Grossman Professor of Jewish Studies in the Religious Studies Department. Since retirement from ASU, he resided in Chicago.

Samuelson lectured at Vanderbilt University Divinity School and Lancaster University in England, a visiting associate professor at the University of Pennsylvania Religious Studies Department (1984), and a guest professor at the University of Hamburg, Fachbereich evangelische Theologie (Summer 1995).

=== Fellowships and memberships ===
His fellowships included a Fulbright-Hayes Research Fellowship at Hebrew University of Jerusalem from 1967 to 1968; a fellowship at the Oxford Centre for Postgraduate Hebrew Studies at Oxford University in 1987; a fellowship at the Chicago Center for Religion and Science in 1992; and a Fulbright Senior Professor Travel Fellowship at the University of Hamburg, Germany, in 1993.

Samuelson was a founding member of the International Society for Science and Religion. He was a member of the board of directors of the Metanexus Institute and of that organization's academic board. He was also a member of the presidium of the International Franz Rosenzweig Gesellschaft, a member of the International Hermann Cohen Gesellschaft, and a member of the editorial board of The Journal of Jewish Thought and Philosophy.

He was a fellow of the Academy of Jewish Philosophy since 1979, serving as chairman from 1979 to 1988 and Secretary-Treasurer from 1988 until his retirement. He was a Life Member of Clare Hall, University of Cambridge, United Kingdom.

== Community service ==
For several years, Samuelson taught a weekly course on Maimonides' Mishneh Torah to rabbis in the East Valley of the Phoenix metropolitan area. From 2001 to 2004 he delivered a weekly adult education class on the history of Jewish philosophy for the Reform and Conservative synagogues in the East Valley. He also taught adult education classes at Anshe Emet Synagogue in Chicago.

== Personal life ==
Samuelson was married to Eileen Levinson from 1957 to 1996. They had two children: Jeffrey (1962–2004) and Miriam (born 1969).

Samuelson married Hava Tirosh-Rothschild in 1997; she changed her name to Hava Tirosh-Samuelson. Tirosh-Samuelson (b. 1950, Kibbutz Afikim, Israel), is Director of Jewish Studies, Regents Professor of History, and Irving and Miriam Lowe Professor of Modern Judaism at Arizona State University. The Samuelsons co-founded the Judaism, Science and Medicine Group in ASU's Jewish Studies Department in 2008 and occasionally appeared in the same conference programs. In 2006, the couple summarized their joint positions on transhumanism in an article in Milestones, published by the John Templeton Foundation.

Samuelson and Tirosh divorced, after which Samuelson married Jewish historian Amy Hill Shevitz in 2013. Samuelson died in his birthplace of Chicago, Illinois on 9 May 2022, at the age of 86.

== Bibliography ==
=== Books ===
- Gersonides' The Wars of the Lord, Treatise III: On God's knowledge. Toronto: Pontifical Institute of Mediaeval Studies. 1977. ISBN 0-88844-268-8. (editor and translator)
- Creation and The End of Days: Judaism and scientific cosmology. Atlanta: Scholars Press. 1987. ISBN 0-89130-990-X.
- An Introduction to Modern Jewish Philosophy. Albany: State University of New York Press. 1989. ISBN 0-88706-959-2.
  - Review by M. Goldberg, The Journal of Religion, April 1990, volume 70, number 2, pp. 282–283.
- The First Seven Days: A philosophical commentary on the creation of Genesis. Atlanta: Scholars Press. 1992. ISBN 1-55540-768-4.
  - Review by Leonard S Kravitz, AJS Review, 1995, volume 20, number 1, pp. 202–205.
- Judaism and the Doctrine of Creation. Cambridge University Press. 1994. ISBN 0-521-45214-7.
- A User's Guide to Franz Rosenzweig's Star of Redemption. Surrey, England: Curzon Press. 1999. ISBN 0-7007-1063-9.
- Revelation and the God of Israel. New York: Cambridge University Press. 2002. ISBN 0-521-81202-X.
  - Review by Benjamin E. Sax, The Journal of Religion, April 2004, volume 84, number 2, pages 324–326.
  - Review by Michael Zank, Modern Judaism, February 2004, volume 24, number 1, pages 93–100.
- Jewish Philosophy: An Historical Introduction. London/New York: Continuum. 2003. ISBN 0-8264-6140-9.
- The Legacy of Franz Rosenzweig: Collected Essays. Cornell University Press. 2004. ISBN 90-5867-372-3. (editor with Luc Anckaert and Martin Brasser)
- Jewish Faith and Modern Science: On the death and rebirth of Jewish philosophy. Rowman & Littlefield Publishers. 2009. ISBN 978-0-7425-5892-2.

=== Monographs ===
- Biblical Jewish Thought: The origins of Judaism. University of Virginia. 1972. p. 96.
- Modern Jewish Thought: Major trends in Judaism. University of Virginia. 1972. p. 80.
- Rabbinic Thought: The foundations of Judaism. University of Virginia. 1976. p. 74.
- Medieval Jewish Thought: The philosophies of Judaism. University of Virginia. 1976. p. 88.
- Reason and revelation as authority in Judaism. Academy for Jewish Philosophy. 1981. p. 113.
- Judaism and Language. Academy for Jewish Philosophy. 1982. p. 100.

=== Book chapters ===
- "Judaism and Science", chapter in Clayton, Philip; Simpson, Zachary (2006). The Oxford handbook of religion and science. Oxford, New York: Oxford University Press. pp. 41–56. ISBN 0-19-927927-6.

=== Peer-reviewed articles (selected) ===
- Ethics of Globalization and the AIDS Crisis from a Jewish Perspective Zygon, 38, number 1 (2003): pages 125–139
- Autonomy in Jewish Philosophy "Journal of the American Academy of Religion," 72, no. 2 (2004): pages 560–563
- The Death and Revival of Jewish Philosophy Journal of the American Academy of Religion, March, 2002, volume 70, number 1, pages 117-134
- Rethinking Ethics in the Light of Jewish Thought and the Life Sciences Journal of Religious Ethics, 29, number 2 (2001): pages 209–233
- Culture And History: Essential Partners In The Conversation Between Religion And Science ;Zygon, 40, number 2 (2005): pages 335–350
- Creation and the Symbiosis of Science and Judaism Zygon, 37, number 1 (2002): pages 137–142
- The Economy of the Gift: Paul Ricoeur's Significance for Theological Ethics Journal of Religious Ethics, 29, no. 2 (2001): pages 235–260
- On the Symbiosis of Science and Religion: A Jewish Perspective Zygon, 35, number 1 (2000): pages 83–97
- That the God of the Philosophers Is Not the God of Abraham, Isaac, and Jacob The Harvard Theological Review, Jan., 1972, volume 65, number 1, pages 1–27
- Ibn Daud's Conception of Prophecy Journal of the American Academy of Religion, September, 1977, volume 45, number 3, page 354
- "Maimonides' Doctrine of Creation", The Harvard Theological Review, Volume 84, Number 3, July, 1991, pages 249–271
