= Montville Baptist Church =

Historic church in Massachusetts, United States

- U.S. National Register of Historic Places
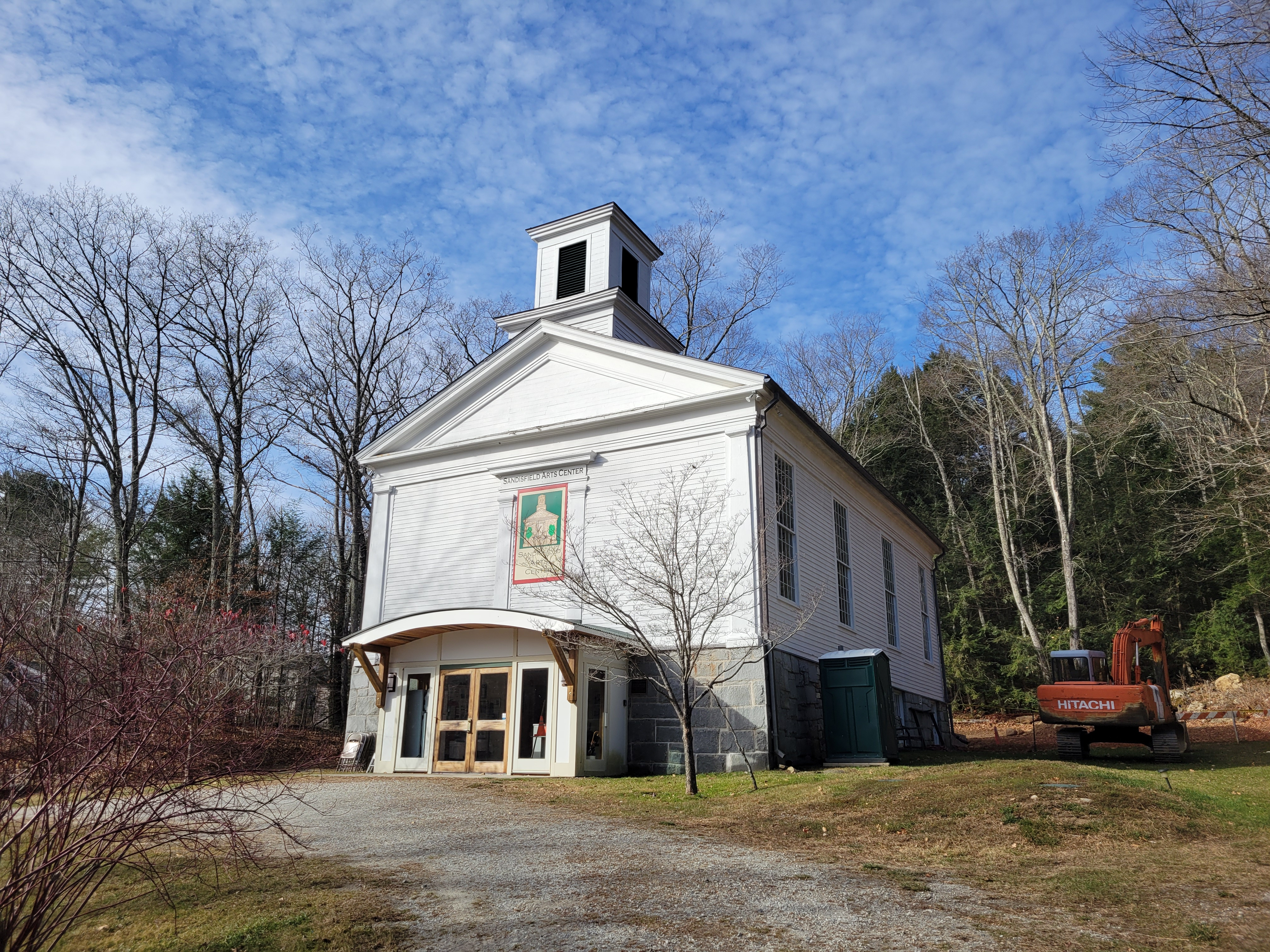
- Former Montville Baptist Church

- Location within Massachusetts Location within the United States
- Location: 5 Hammertown Rd. Sandisfield, Massachusetts
- Coordinates: 42°7′7″N 73°7′29″W
- Built: 1839
- Architect: Barker, C. & M. Crittenden; Barker, L. & J.P. Bentley
- Architectural style: Greek Revival
- NRHP reference No.: 06000936
- Added to NRHP: October 12, 2006

The Montville Baptist Church, now known as the Sandisfield Arts Center, is an historic former Baptist church and Orthodox Jewish synagogue at 5 Hammertown Road in Sandisfield, Massachusetts. The Greek Revival building was constructed in 1839 as a Baptist church. After 83 years as a Baptist church meeting house, the building was converted into use as an Orthodox synagogue for 75 years. In 1995 the Sandisfield Arts Center formed as a non-profit to preserve the building. The building was added to the National Register of Historic Places in 2006.

== Description and history ==
The former Montville Baptist Church stands in a rural area of central Sandisfield, just east of the junction of Hammertown Road with Sandisfield Road (Massachusetts Route 57). It is a single-story wood frame structure, set on a granite foundation and covered by a gabled roof. Its exterior is finished in wooden clapboards. The front facade has corner pilasters rising to an entablature and fully pedimented gable, with a two-stage square tower rising above the roof ridge. The basement is fully exposed in the front, with the main entrance now consisting of four doors at the center of the basement level. Above this, a pair of pilasters flank a sign labeled "Sandisfield Arts Center", and rise to an entablature and cornice just below the main entablature. The interior provides a multifunction space in the basement level, with kitchen and dining area, while the upper area is a large open two-story space. A cabinet previously used as a Torah ark is set against the rear wall.

The building was erected in 1839-42 by the local Baptist society, formed in 1829 through the merger of two older Baptist societies (founded 1779 and 1790). The Baptist congregation declined, and the church was turned over to county Baptist organization in 1894. It stood vacant and in declining condition until 1921, when it was acquired by a local Jewish congregation, established in the area after an influx of immigrants over the previous ten years. Under the auspices of the B'nai Abraham Orthodox Jewish congregation, the building was raised and the present foundation was installed. Corner stairs were added, allowing for separate access to the gender-segregated parts of the sanctuary. The synagogue closed in the 1940s due to declining participation. It was briefly revived in the 1980s, but failed due to insufficient numbers to meet Jewish laws. The building was formally turned over by the remnant congregation to the Sandisfield Arts Center in 1996.

== See also ==
- National Register of Historic Places listings in Berkshire County, Massachusetts
