= Temple Sinai (Houston) =

Reform synagogue in Houston, Texas, US

- Location in Texas

Religion
- Affiliation: Reform Judaism
- Ecclesiastical or organizational status: Synagogue
- Leadership: Rabbi David Lipper
- Status: Active

Location
- Location: 13875 Brimhurst Drive, Houston, Texas 77077
- Country: United States
- Interactive map of Temple Sinai
- Coordinates: 29°45′41″N 95°37′52″W

Architecture
- Established: 1979 (as a congregation)
- Completed: 2003

Website
- temple-sinai.org

Temple Sinai is a Reform Jewish synagogue located 13875 Brimhurst Drive, in Houston, Texas, in the United States. Jewish residents on the west side of Houston and its western suburbs, including Katy, Cinco Ranch and Sugar Land worship at the synagogue.

The congregation is composed of more than 200 families and is led by Rabbi David Lipper since 2022. The synagogue is a member of the Union for Reform Judaism and its youth group is associated with the North American Federation of Temple Youth.

== History ==
The congregation was founded in 1979 by nine families seeking to establish a Reform Jewish presence in western Harris County. Its first Rabbi, Abraham Shaw served in a part-time capacity until 1984, when he was succeeded by Rabbi Howard Rabinowitz. The congregation experienced significant growth in the 1990s, resulting in the hiring of its first full-time rabbi, Todd Thalblum, in 1999. Land was purchased in 2000, and the construction of a new building began in 2002 and completed in July 2003.

Rabbi Thalblum served until 2008 and was succeeded by Rabbi Barry Diamond on an interim basis until a new rabbi was selected. In 2009, Temple Sinai hired Rabbi Annie Belford who was one of the first women to serve as a solo rabbi for a Houston congregation.
