= Jericho Jewish Center =

Conservative Jewish congregation in Jericho, New York

- Location on Long Island, New York

Religion
- Affiliation: Conservative Judaism
- Ecclesiastical or organisational status: Synagogue
- Status: Active

Location
- Location: 430 North Broadway, Jericho, Long Island, New York 11753
- Country: United States
- Coordinates: 40°47′21″N 73°32′14″W

Architecture
- Established: 1955 (as a congregation)
- Groundbreaking: 1959
- Completed: 1960

Website
- jerichojc.com

The Jericho Jewish Center is a Conservative congregation and synagogue located at 430 North Broadway, Jericho, New York, in the United States.

== History ==
The congregation was established in 1955, when it began meeting on a local private estate. Construction of the Jericho Jewish Center synagogue began in June 1959, and was completed in 1960. The Iken STEM Science Academy Preschool, housed in the Jericho Jewish Center, opened in 2016.

In 2022 it was reported that the congregation's attempts to consolidate with a nearby Conservative congregation, the Woodbury Jewish Center, failed and that the future of the Jericho Jewish Center was uncertain. Rabbi Matthew Abelson stood down from his position following a vote to merge the congregations.

== See also ==
- Temple Beth-El (Great Neck, New York)
