= Mattoon Jewish Community Center =

Reform synagogue in Charleston, Illinois, United States

- Location in Illinois

Religion
- Affiliation: Reform Judaism
- Ecclesiastical or organizational status: Synagogue
- Status: Active

Location
- Location: Wesley United Methodist Church, 2206 4th Street, Charleston, Illinois 61920
- Country: United States of America
- Interactive map of Mattoon Jewish Community Center
- Coordinates: 39°28′59″N 88°22′54″W

Architecture
- Established: 1948 (as a congregation)

The Mattoon Jewish Community Center (MJCC) is a Reform Jewish congregation and synagogue located in Mattoon, Illinois, a city which has had a Jewish community for at least 150 years.

In 2012, National Post reported that MJCC was the smallest Reform congregation in North America, consisting of four households. The next smallest Reform congregation in North America is Temple Beth Tikvah in Regina, Saskatchewan, Canada, with five households.

As of 2025, the congregation has grown to nine households. The congregation's services are held in the Wesley United Methodist Church at 2206 4th Street in Charleston, Illinois.

== History ==
In 1948, the local Jewish community incorporated and established the first organized synagogue in Mattoon. A residential house was purchased at 1607 Richmond Avenue for this purpose and was named "The Mattoon Jewish Community Center" (MJCC).

MJCC remodeled the interior to include a central assembly and worship area. The Ark, which contained two Torahs, was at the south end of the room. The Eternal Light hung from the ceiling above the Ark. To its left was the bronze, illuminated Memorial Board, which displayed the names of deceased members of the congregation. An electrical neon sign displaying a Magen David was in the window and was illuminated during Sabbath services. The north end of the building featured a professional-style kitchen with a commercial stove and large refrigerator. These facilities were used for community meals and fundraisers.

In the early 1960s, local businessman and scholar Aaron Steinberg assumed the presidency. For the next 25 years, the MJCC held a regular schedule of worship services and adult education classes. Student rabbis from the Hebrew Union College in Cincinnati led the services and provided adult education.

== Antisemitism ==
In the spring of 2000, the MJCC was the target of an anti-Semitic organization. "Wanted posters" were stapled to phone poles and distributed around the neighborhood, threatening messages were left in the mailbox, and a swastika was spray-painted on the side of the building. In response, Mattoon police provided a visible presence during the Passover services that year. The MJCC met with local churches and interfaith organizations to organize a public "Not in Our Town" campaign. No further incidents were reported.

== Place of worship ==
The MJCC congregation currently uses the facilities of the Trinity Episcopal Church at 2200 Western Avenue in Mattoon for Sabbath and the High Holy Day services. The Ark, containing two Torah scrolls, resides in the sanctuary next to the altar. The Trinity Episcopal Church was listed on the National Register of Historic Places on March 19, 1982.

== See also ==
- History of the Jews in Illinois
- Unity Church (Mattoon, Illinois)
