= Hebrew Congregation of Woodmont =

Orthodox synagogue located in Woodmont, Connecticut, in the United States

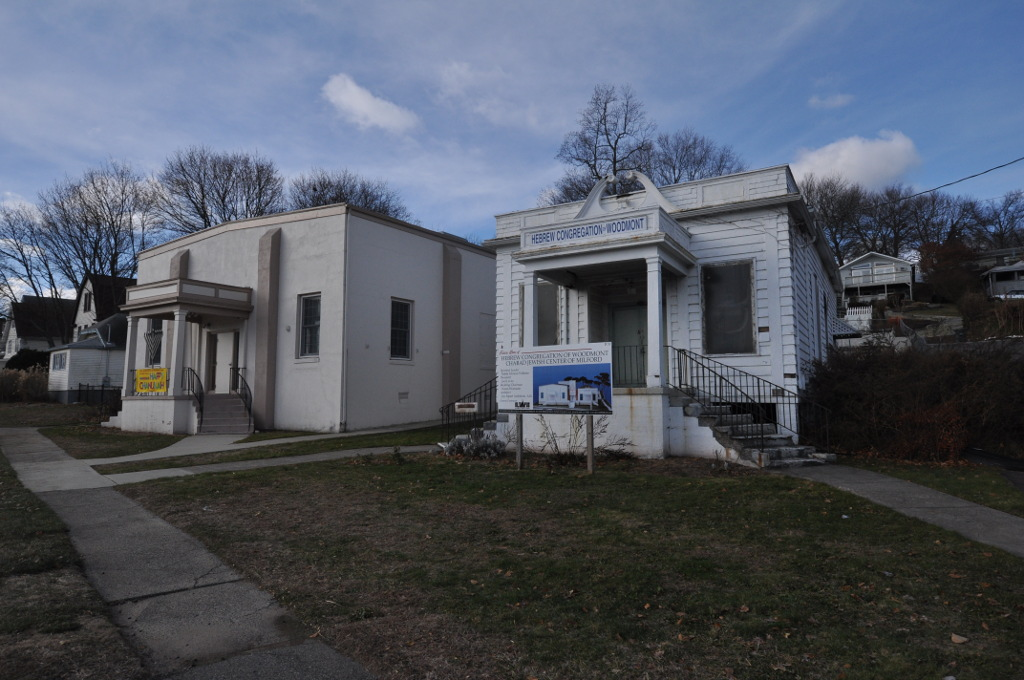

- Location in Connecticut

Religion
- Affiliation: Orthodox Judaism
- Ecclesiastical or organizational status: Synagogue
- Leadership: Rabbi Schneur Wilhelm
- Status: Active

Location
- Location: 15 and 17 Edgefield Avenue, Woodmont, Milford, Connecticut
- Country: United States
- Interactive map of Hebrew Congregation of Woodmont
- Coordinates: 41°13′33″N 73°0′5″W

Architecture
- Architects: Charles H. Abramovitz; Jacob Schiff
- Type: Synagogue
- Style: Colonial Revival
- Established: 1920 (as a congregation)
- Completed: 1926

Website
- jewishmilford.com
- Hebrew Congregation of Woodmont
- U.S. National Register of Historic Places
- Area: 3 acres (1.2 ha)
- MPS: Historic Synagogues of Connecticut MPS
- NRHP reference No.: 95000860
- Added to NRHP: July 21, 1995

The Hebrew Congregation of Woodmont is an Orthodox synagogue located at 15 and 17 Edgefield Avenue, Woodmont, Milford, Connecticut, in the United States. The historic 1926 beach summer, resort synagogue was listed on the National Register of Historic Places in 1995.

== Historic building ==
The small, wood-frame, clapboard synagogue was built in the Colonial Revival style typical of small New England towns for seasonal use by Jewish families who came to stay on the beach in the summer months. An adjacent social hall was built in 1946.

In 2012, the historic building was badly damaged by a fire, caused by an electrical wiring problem. A reconstruction was quickly planned to restore both the 1926 sanctuary and the adjacent 1946 social hall, which suffered minor damage. The social hall was restored in time for the High Holy Days in 2013.

The building was one of fifteen Connecticut synagogues added to the National Register of Historic Places in 1995 and 1996 in response to an unprecedented multiple submission, nominating nineteen synagogues.

== Congregation ==
The congregation began in 1920, meeting during the summer months in the vacation home of Rabbi Yehuda Heschel Levenberg. Ground was broken for a permanent synagogue building in 1926, and completed by the summer vacation season of 1927. A summer Sunday school opened in 1936, and a social hall was built in 1946. By the early 21st century, however, the summer population had declined and the diminished congregation hired Rabbi Schneur and Chanie Wilhelm of the Chabad movement in 2007 with the hope that they could attract enough members to make the Hebrew Congregation into a year-round synagogue. As of 2014, services were being held on the Sabbath and Jewish holidays year-round.

== See also ==
- National Register of Historic Places listings in New Haven County, Connecticut
