= Morristown Jewish Center =

Conservative congregation and synagogue in New Jersey

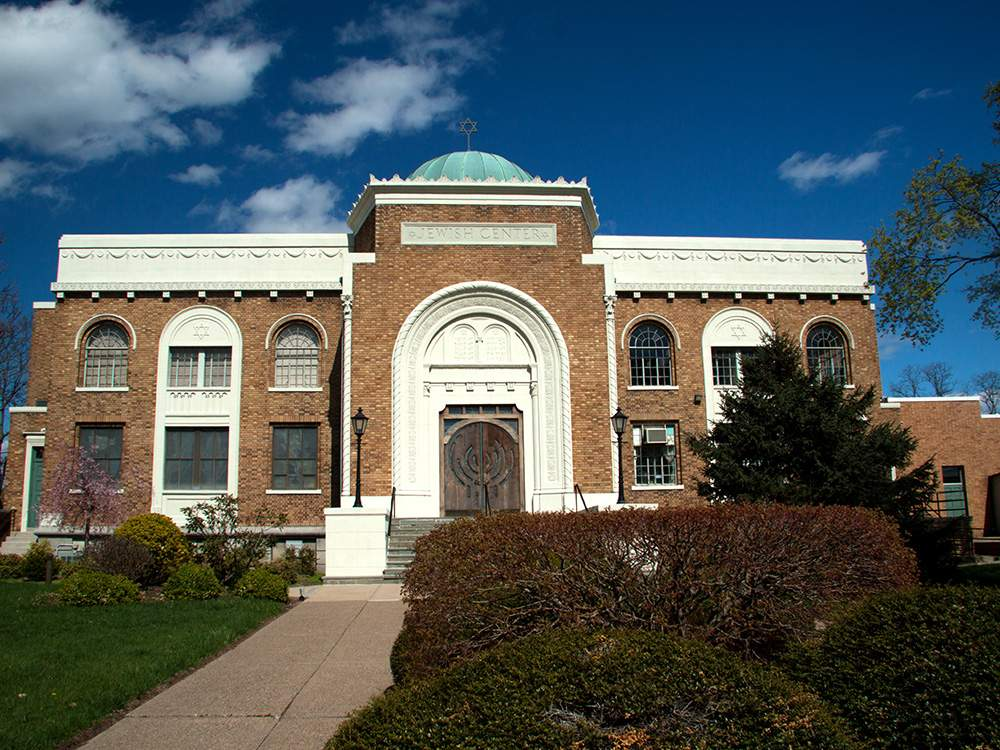
- Front facade of the 1929 structure

- Location in Morris County, New Jersey

Religion
- Affiliation: Conservative Judaism
- Ecclesiastical or organizational status: Synagogue
- Leadership: Rabbi Adam Gillman
- Status: Active

Location
- Location: 177 Speedwell Avenue, Morristown, Morris County, New Jersey
- Interactive map of Morristown Jewish Center
- Coordinates: 40°48′14″N 74°28′55″W

Architecture
- Established: 1899 (as a congregation)
- Completed: 1929

Website
- mjcby.org

Morristown Jewish Center, officially Morristown Jewish Center Beit Yisrael, abbreviated as MJCBY, is a Conservative congregation and synagogue located in Morristown, New Jersey, in the United States. It was formally incorporated in 1899, while its building was constructed in 1929.

MJCBY is affiliated with Conservative Judaism although originally having started as an Orthodox congregation.

It is the oldest active congregation in Morristown, having a significant historic Jewish community during its era of peak significance.

== History ==
The first known Jews to settle in Morristown came in the 1850's, and the first Jewish child in the area was born in 1860, with several Jewish families being resident by the end of the 1860's. These families were primarily of German-Jewish heritage. Starting in the 1890's Eastern European Jews began to settle in the area, who would in time become the majority of the Jewish population of the area.

During the early part of the 1890's, Ashkenazi Jews would travel to other locales in the New York City metro area for High Holiday services, but this changed in the mid-1890's when a group of local Jews took up a collection to buy a Torah scroll in New York City for $35. The first known minyan met at a home at 4 Race Street in Morristown on January 24, 1895. In 1898, the decision was made to formally incorporate as the "House of Israel of Morristown, New Jersey" (Beit Yisrael) which took place on January 5, 1899.

On November 4, 1929 the congregation opened a Jewish community center. but due to the stock market crash of 1929, the community struggled to pay off the notes for the construction.

In the early 1900s, Speedwell Avenue was a hub for peddlers and small businesses many of which were Jewish-owned. Since then, much of the community has moved to suburbs such as Randolph and Morris Plains. Morristown still today, however, maintains a significant Jewish community with MJCBY, orthodox shul Ahavath Yisrael, and Lubavitch yeshiva Rabbinical College of America.

=== 20th century to present ===
In 1998, the congregation was mentioned alongside two other local synagogues in the remarks of Congressman Rodney Frelinghuysen on the floor of Congress.

As of 2021, the congregation has an active scholar-in-residence program.
