= North Country Reform Temple =

Reform synagogue in Glen Cove, New York, US

North Country Reform Temple Ner Tamid
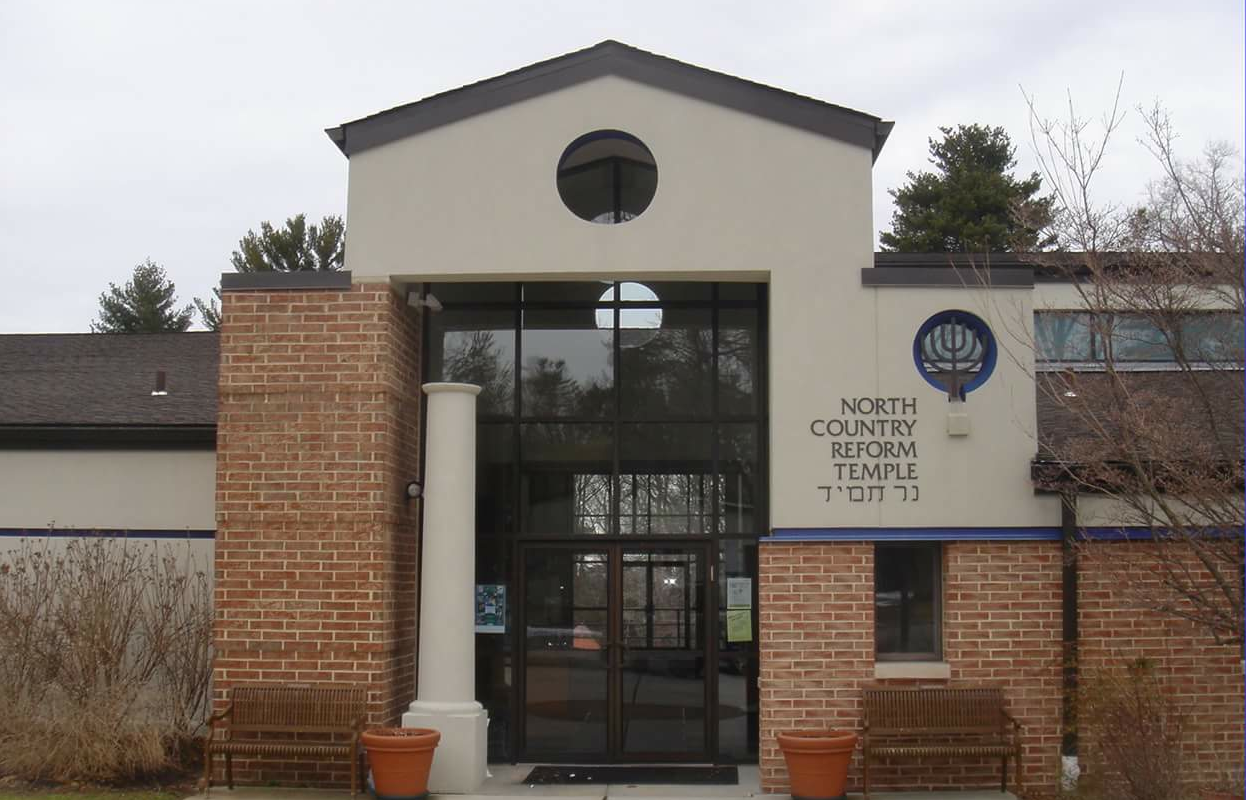

- Location on Long Island, New York

Religion
- Affiliation: Reform Judaism
- Ecclesiastical or organisational status: Synagogue
- Leadership: Rabbi Michael S. Churgel

Location
- Location: 86 Crescent Beach Road, Glen Cove, Nassau County, New York 11542
- Country: United States
- Coordinates: 40°52′39″N 73°38′26″W

Architecture
- Established: 1956 (as a congregation)
- Completed: 1906 (original building); 1985 (current building)
- Destroyed: 1982 (original building)

Website
- northcountryreformtemple.org

North Country Reform Temple-Ner Tamid is a Reform Jewish synagogue located at 86 Crescent Beach Road, in Glen Cove, Nassau County, New York, in the United States.

Founded in 1956, the temple has employed two facilities in Glen Cove, the first burning down in 1982. Following that, the congregation was sheltered by the local Congregation Tifereth Israel and St. Paul's Episcopal Church for three years until the dedication of the current synagogue in 1985.

Rabbi Michael S. Churgel is the rabbi, as of December 2023.

== History ==
In 1955, the nearest Reform synagogue to Glen Cove, NY was Roslyn's Temple Sinai. Alvin Rubin, then-rabbi of the Roslyn congregation, recommended to 30 of the 40 families in his congregation to meet at the household of congregant Paul Ressler to discuss planning a new Reform congregation. Assisted by the Union for Reform Judaism (URJ), at that time called the Union of American Hebrew Congregations, the congregation held its first independent service at Friends Academy in January 1956. That March, Kal Macklin, who was among the original congregants who met at the Ressler household, was elected as president of the congregation. At the time of the High Holidays, the congregation numbered 100 and was offered housing from Methodist and Masonic churches, and the local Neighborhood House.

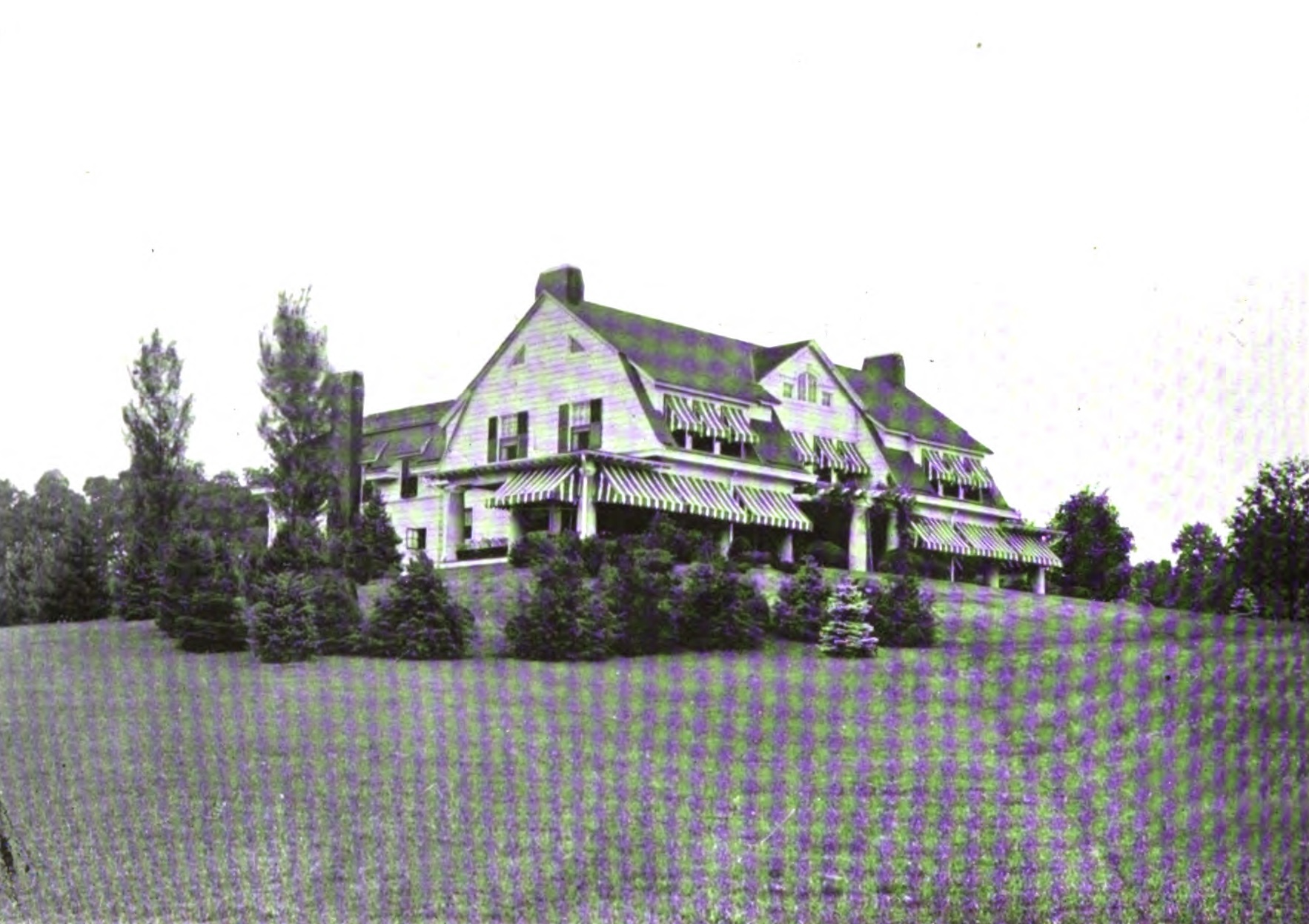
Ken Klare in Glen Cove, before it’s conversion into the North Country Reform Temple

In May 1957, the congregation moved to its first self-owned temple. The structure, which had been built in 1906, was formerly a Gilded Age mansion known as “Ken Klare.” It’s early owners included Henry L. Batterman and Clarence Kenyon, the latter of which made the location noted for its sprawling gardens. By the time it had been acquired by the Conregration, though, “Ken Klare” required restoration. This would be conducted by the congregation and the Temple would open shortly thereafter. In 1974, Laurence Kotok became the congregation's fourth rabbi. In 1978, the congregation elected its first woman president, Susan Cort. That same year, the sanctuary was enlarged. In 1982, the synagogue's kitchen was renovated at a cost of $25,000. On February 17, a nineteen-year-old janitor accidentally set fire to the synagogue while attempting to soften wax contained by plastic with fire. Attempting to extinguish the blaze resulted in an explosion which destroyed the building's framework. Despite the efforts of firefighters, the entire building was destroyed, with the exception of a single column, which stands at the front of the new building. The janitor falsified evidence to convince police vandals were to blame for the blaze, but ended up pleading guilty to arson two months later.

With the displaced assembly now sheltered by a local congregation and church, the towns surrounding Glen Cove held a large fundraiser that provided enough to fund the construction of a new synagogue. Groundbreaking began August 21, 1983 and the synagogue was finally completed on February 10, 1985, being dedicated with "Ner Tamid" affixed to the title that May. Rabbi Kotok continued as rabbi until 1996, when he accepted a position with Temple B'rith Kodesh, the oldest and largest Reform congregation in Rochester, New York, from which he retired in 2014. Kotok was replaced by the current rabbi, Dr. Janet B. Liss, marking both the first woman and member of the LGBT community to ever head the congregation. Liss had previously served as the rabbi for the Reform congregation Temple Kol Ami in Plantation, Florida. As of 2017 more than 325 families belong to the congregation, and the Temple hosts a K-5 religious school, a URJ-affiliated youth group, and a sisterhood.

== Gallery ==
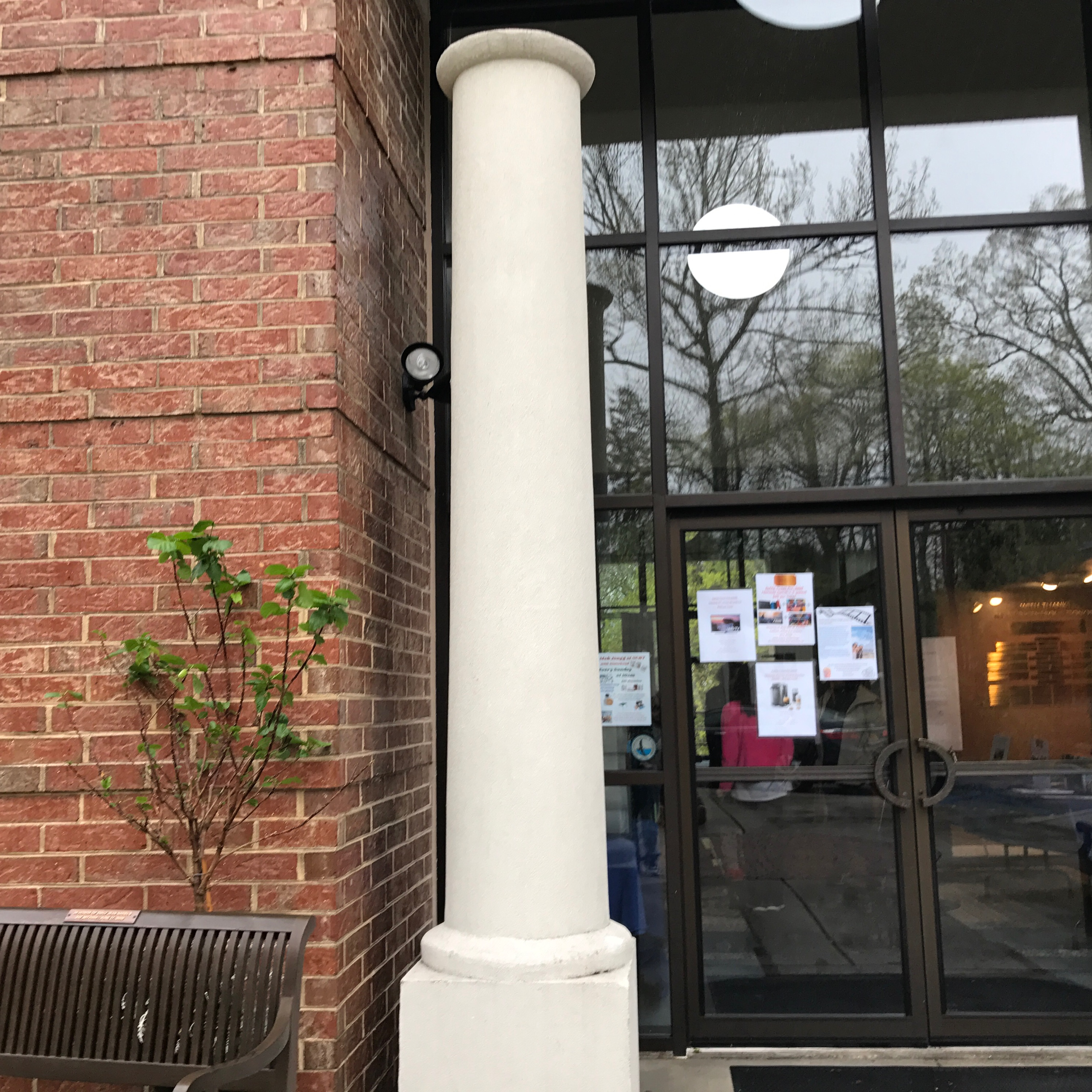
Standing at the entrance of the current temple, a single column from the original temple, the only surviving remnant from the fire in 1982.

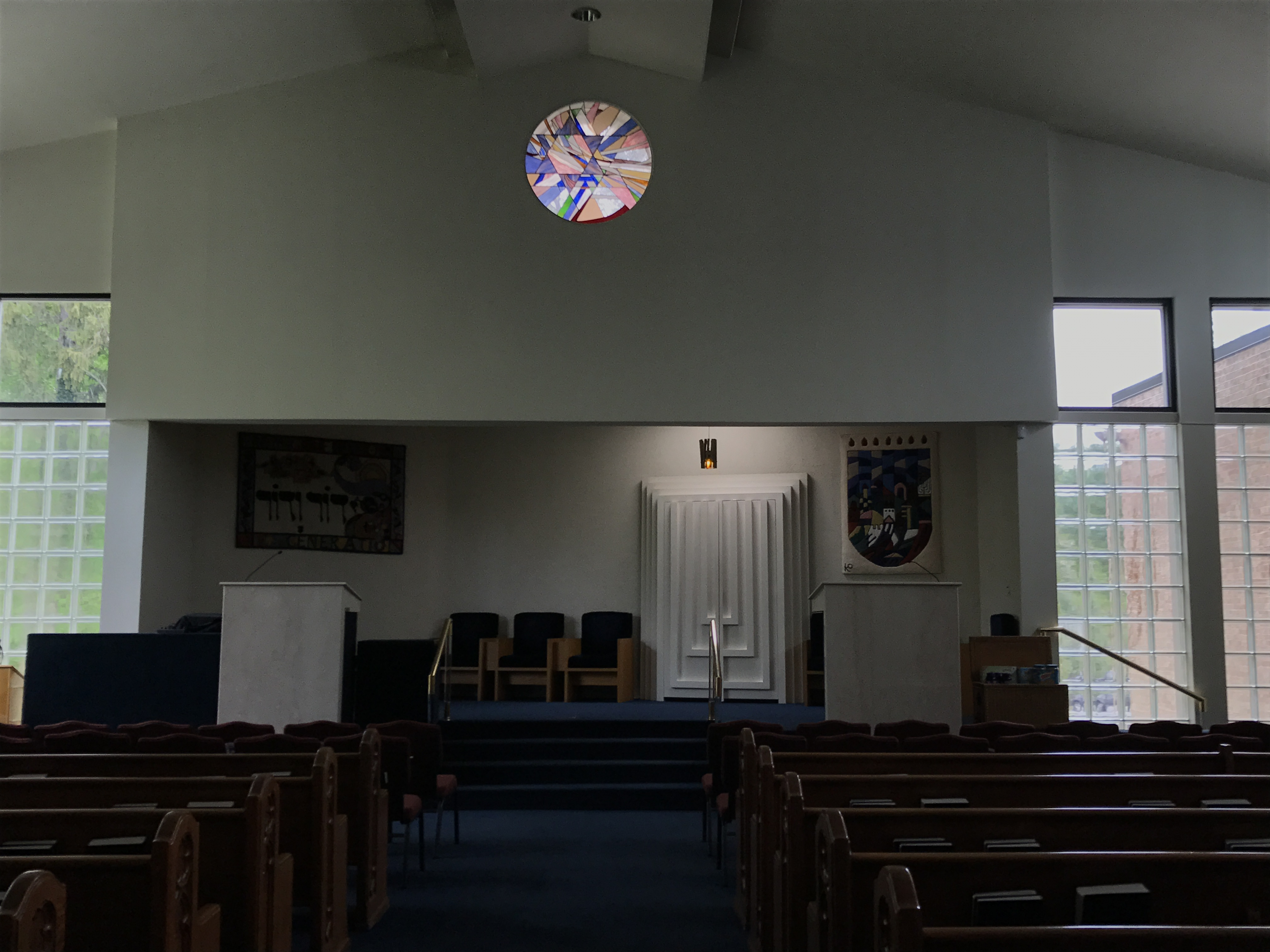
The Temple sanctuary. Visible on the bimah is the namesake ner tamid hanging before the Torah ark. To the right is the ornamental piece ("mizrach") depicting Jerusalem which marks the Mizrah

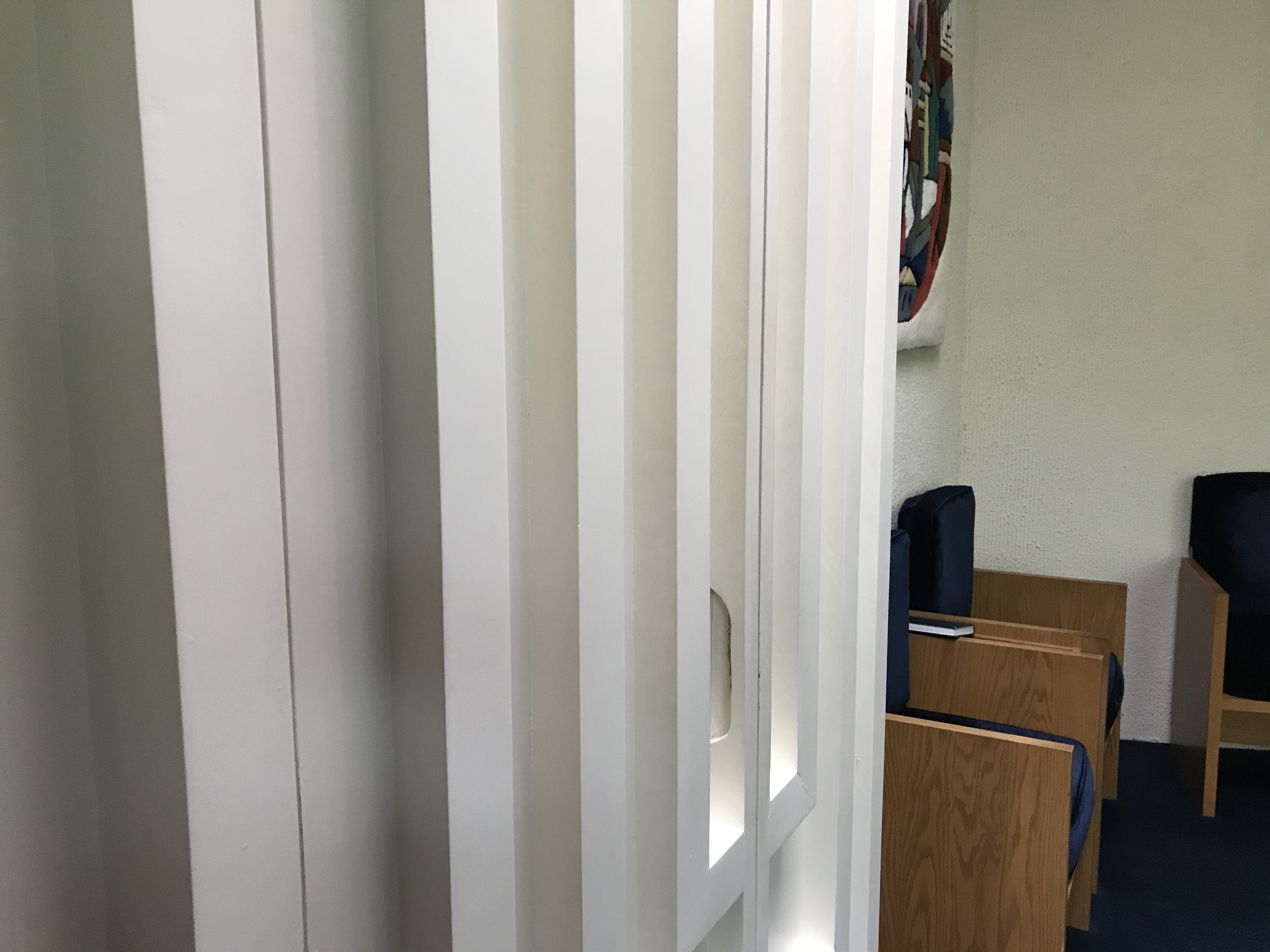
Close-up of the Toah Ark

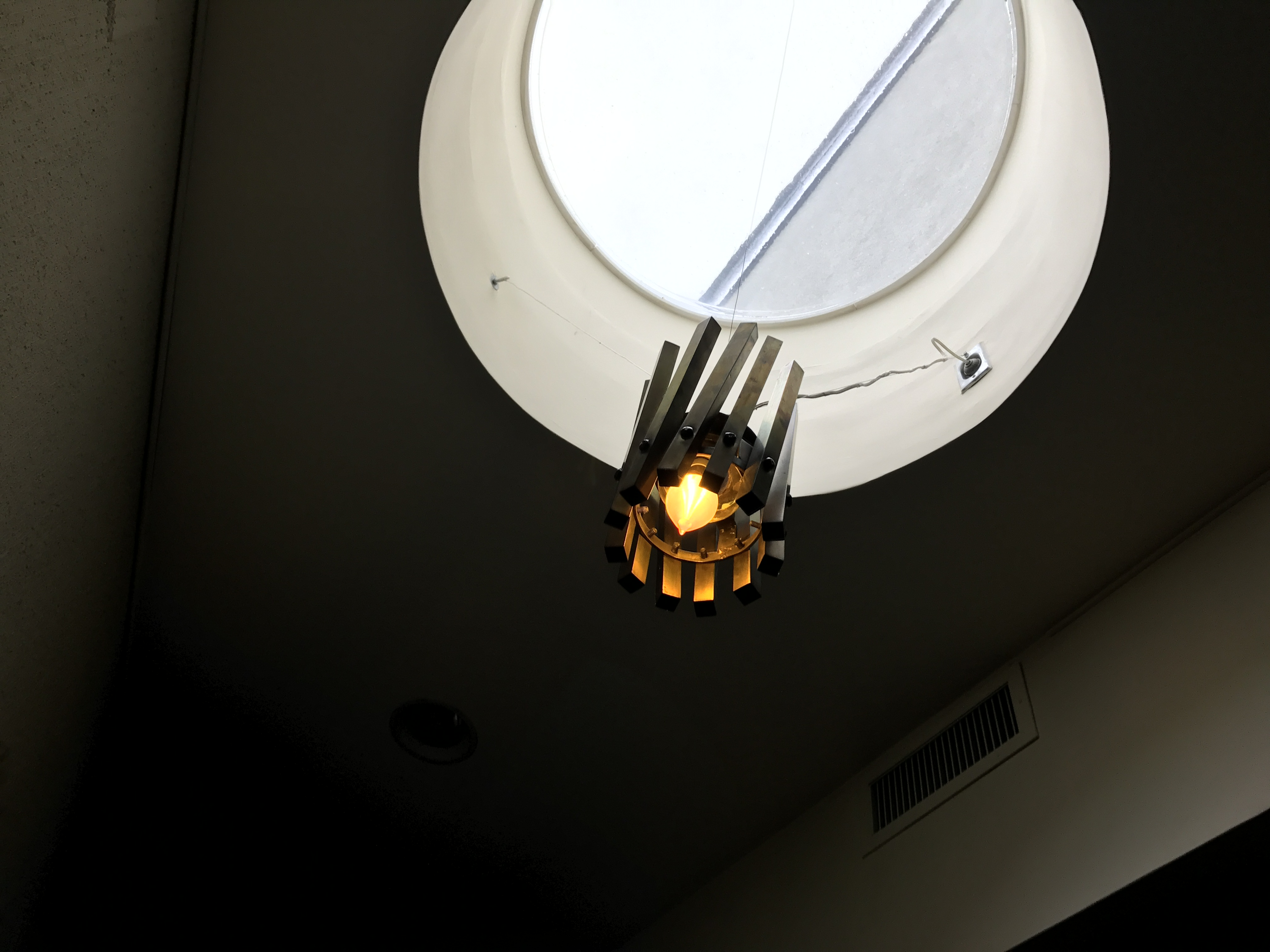
Close-up of the sanctuary lamp, the ner tamid

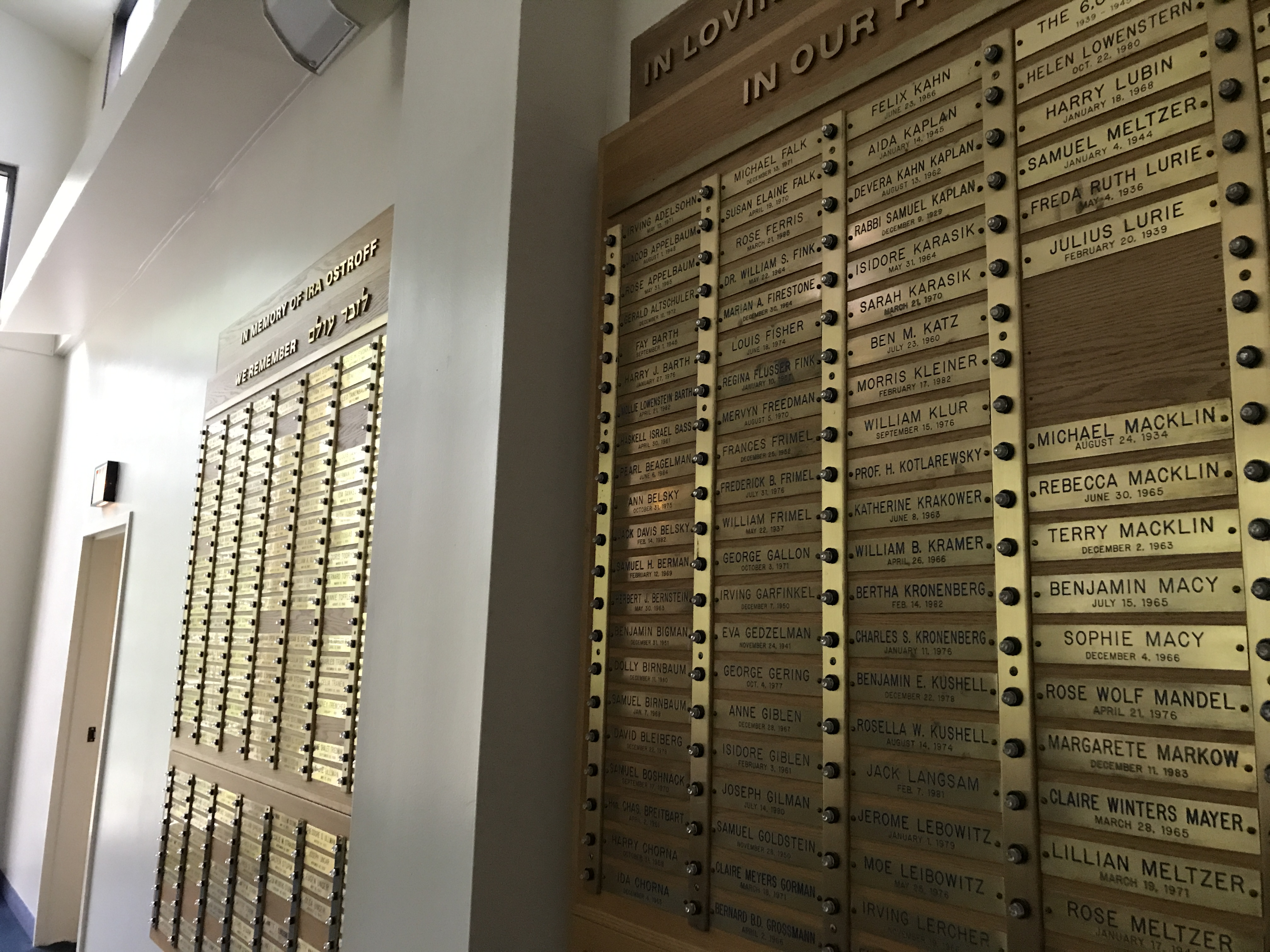
Yahrzeit plaques, used to memorizalize the dead in place of the traditional use of candles. Plaques that are burnt and scarred survived the 1982 fire that destroyed the original synagogue.
