= Mt. Sinai Synagogue =

Historic synagogue in Wyoming, US

- Location in Wyoming

Religion
- Affiliation: Judaism
- Rite: Nusach Ashkenaz
- Ecclesiastical or organizational status: Synagogue
- Leadership: Rabbi Moshe Halfon
- Status: Active

Location
- Location: 2610 Pioneer Avenue, Cheyenne, Wyoming 82001
- Country: United States
- Interactive map of Mt. Sinai Synagogue
- Coordinates: 41°08′27″N 104°49′25″W

Architecture
- Architect: Earl C. Morris
- Type: Synagogue
- Style: Mid-Century Modernist
- General contractor: Carl Christensen
- Established: 1910 (as a congregation)
- Completed: 1951

Specifications
- Capacity: 450 worshippers
- Interior area: 13,000 square feet (1,200 m^{2})
- Materials: Steel; red brick
- Mt. Sinai Synagogue
- U.S. National Register of Historic Places
- NRHP reference No.: 100001575
- Added to NRHP: September 5, 2017

The Mt. Sinai Synagogue is a historic synagogue located at 2610 Pioneer Avenue, Cheyenne, Wyoming, in the United States. The synagogue was listed on the National Register of Historic Places in 2017.

The congregation was founded in 1910 by Eastern European and German Jews. In 1915, with the assistance of the Homestead Acts and the Jewish Agricultural Society, the original synagogue building was completed and was the first permanent Jewish house of worship in Wyoming. The synagogue moved in 1951 to its current location.
