= Chevro Ahavath Zion Synagogue =

Former synagogue in Sullivan County, New York, US

- Location in New York

Religion
- Affiliation: Judaism (former)
- Ecclesiastical or organizational status: Synagogue (1951–1974)
- Status: Closed; abandoned

Location
- Location: Cold Spring Road, Monticello, New York 12701
- Country: United States
- Interactive map of Chevro Ahavath Zion Synagogue
- Coordinates: 41°36′42″N 74°40′38″W

Architecture
- Architect: Sam Greenburg
- Type: Synagogue architecture
- Established: 1951 (as a congregation)
- Completed: 1952
- Chevro Ahavath Zion Synagogue
- U.S. National Register of Historic Places
- Area: Less than one acre
- NRHP reference No.: 98001621
- Added to NRHP: January 28, 1999

Chevro Ahavath Zion Synagogue is a historic former Jewish synagogue, located on Cold Spring Road, Monticello, in Sullivan County, New York, in the United States.

The congregation was founded in 1951 and the synagogue building was completed in 1952; believed to stand on the foundation of a synagogue built in 1933 and destroyed by fire. It is a small, two story brick building, three bays wide and three bays deep, with a concrete foundation and gable roof.

The synagogue closed in c. 1974.

The former synagogue building was added to the National Register of Historic Places in 1999.
