= Magen David Sephardic Congregation =

Modern Orthodox synagogue in Maryland, United States

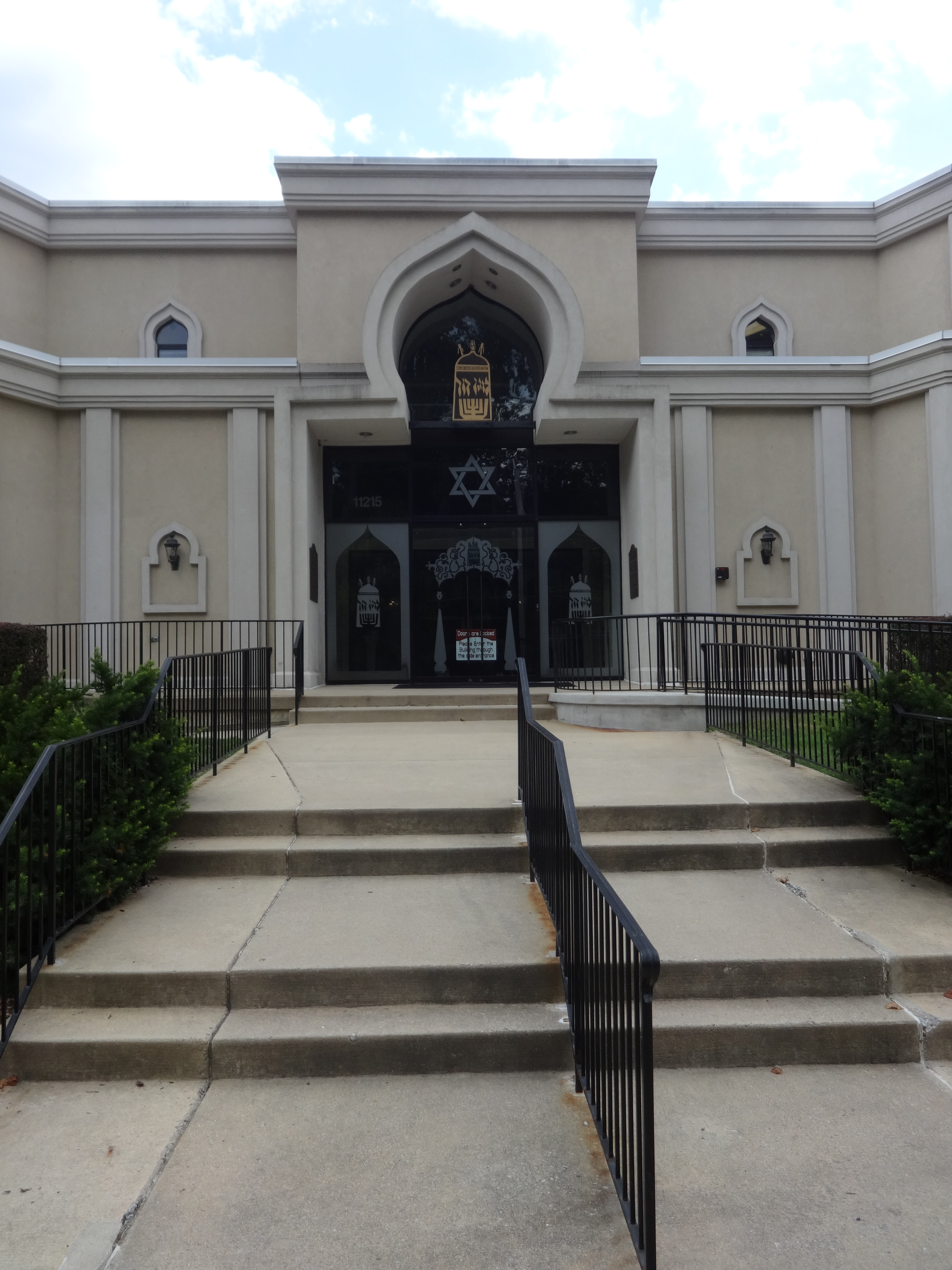

- Location within Maryland

Religion
- Affiliation: Modern Orthodox Judaism
- Rite: Sephardi
- Ecclesiastical or organisational status: Synagogue
- Governing body: Orthodox Union
- Leadership: Rabbi Soussan
- Status: Active

Location
- Location: North Bethesda, Maryland
- Country: United States
- Coordinates: 39°02′26″N 77°06′47″W

Architecture
- Type: Synagogue
- Established: 1966 (as a congregation)
- Completed: 1998

Website
- magendavidsephardic.org

Magen David Sephardic Congregation-Beit Eliahu (abbreviated as MDSCBE) is a Modern Orthodox Jewish congregation and synagogue, located in North Bethesda, Maryland, in the United States. The congregation practices in the Sephardi rite.

== History ==
The first Sephardi Jews began to immigrate to Washington, D.C. in the 1910s and 1920s. Most early Sephardi immigrants to Washington, D.C. were from Turkey and Greece. By the 1940s, Moroccan Jews began to immigrate to Washington, D.C.; immigrants from Algeria, Egypt, Iraq, Iran, Libya, Lebanon, Syria, Tunisia, and elsewhere soon followed. By 1966, these immigrants and their descendants had formed a board of directors for what would become Magen David Sephardic Congregation and a charter was enacted. Due to a lack of a permanent space, the congregation was hosted by a variety of Ashkenazi congregations. The early years of the congregation had a heavily Moroccan style, but gradually began to adopt a more broadly North African and Middle Eastern style as other immigrants joined. Magen David welcomed Ashkenazi visitors and members and embraced European influences, but maintained its Sephardi traditions.

During the 1980s, the congregation met at Tifereth Israel, a Conservative synagogue in Washington, D.C. Later, services were held at Ohr Kodesh, a Conservative synagogue in Chevy Chase. By 1984, the congregation had purchased a building in Rockville, and by 1987, had its first rabbi. Due to surging membership, the congregation needed a larger space. By 1998, prayers were being held in a new synagogue that was built in North Bethesda.

The congregation is affiliated with the Orthodox Union.

== See also ==
- History of the Jews in Maryland
