= List of synagogues and Jewish congregations in Washington =

This is a list of synagogues in the state of Washington, in the United States, ordered by denomination.

== Conservative ==
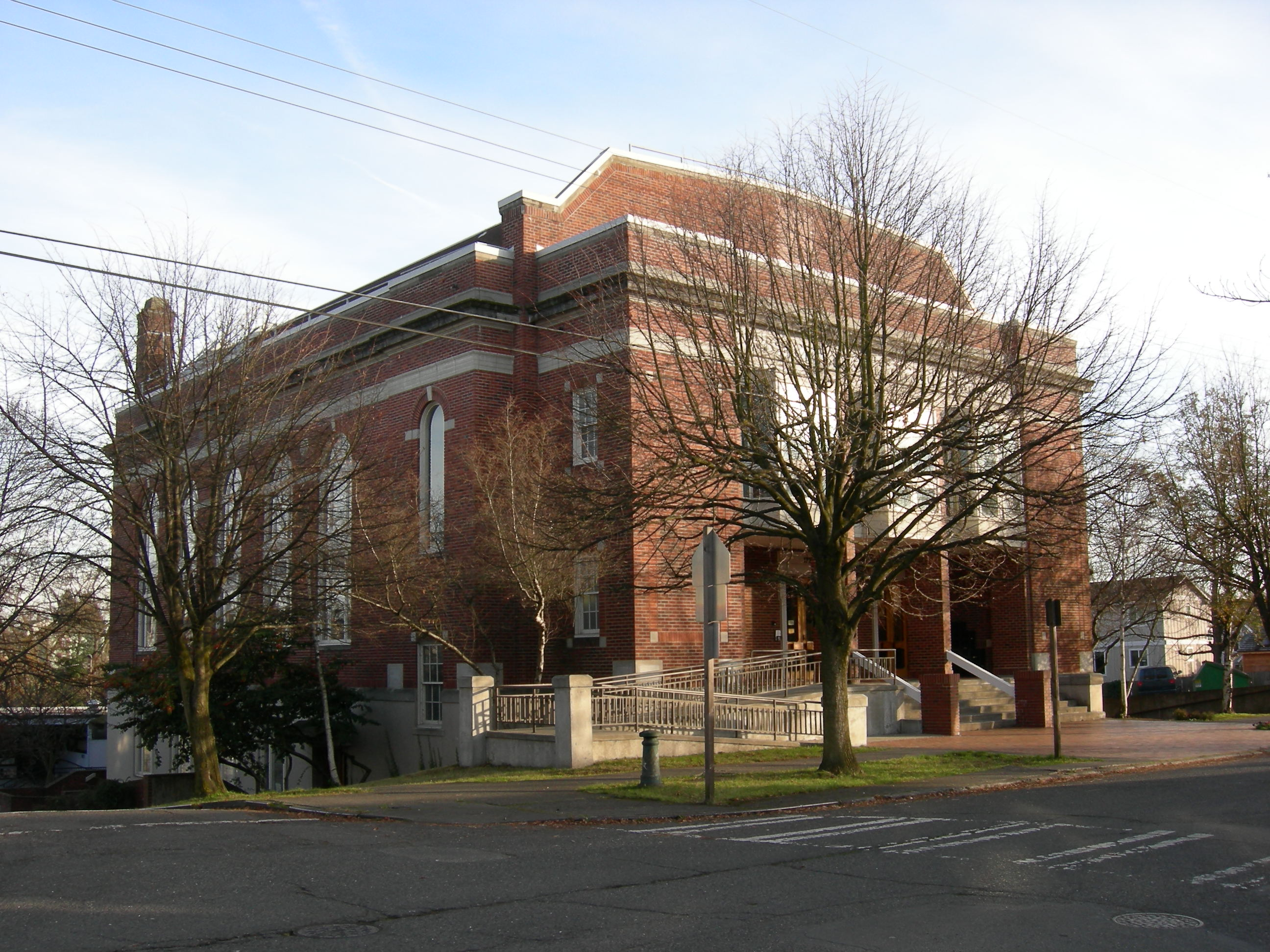
A former synagogue of the Herzl Congregation is now the Odessa Brown Neighborhood Health Clinic.

- Congregation Beth Shalom, Seattle
- Temple Beth Shalom, Spokane
  - This merges the earlier Temple Emanu-El (who founded the state's first synagogue, opened September 12, 1892) and Keneseth Israel
- Congregation Beth Sholom, Richland
  - Originally (1950) Richland Jewish Congregation, took current name 1957
- Congregation B'nai Torah, Olympia
- Herzl-Ner Tamid Conservative Congregation, Mercer Island
  - Originally the Herzl Congregation was an Orthodox congregation in Seattle; in 1929, Congregation Machzikay Hadath split off, remaining Orthodox as the group that retained the name and the synagogue was realigning toward Conservative Judaism. The short-lived New Conservative Congregation, founded 1930 merged with Herzl in 1932 to form the Herzl Conservative Congregation. In 1970 they merged with Congregation Ner Tamid of Bellevue to form the Herzl-Ner Tamid Conservative Congregation, which moved to a new facility on Mercer Island in 1971 (Note: Writing on the synagogue building in Seattles' Central District that later became the Odessa Brown clinic. "In 1929, the Herzl Congregation voted to modernize and became Seattle’s first Conservative congregation. The congregation remained in this location until 1971 when it moved to its present location on Mercer Island, where it is now called Herzl-Ner Conservative Congregation.")
- Kehilat Shalom, Seattle

== Humanist ==
- Secular Jewish Circle of Puget Sound (abbreviated as "SJC"), Seattle
  - Founded in 1994, is affiliated with the Society for Humanistic Judaism. It holds non-theistic holiday and shabbat events, and a K-7 Sunday school.

== Meditational ==
- Bet Alef Meditative Synagogue, Seattle

== Orthodox ==
- Chabad-Lubavitch of Greater Seattle
- Chabad of Bainbridge Island
- Chabad of NW Seattle, Ballard
- Eastside Torah Center, Bellevue
- Chabad of Bellingham
- Chabad of Capitol Hill
- Congregation Shaarei Tefilah-Lubavitch, Seattle
- Chabad of Downtown Seattle
- The Friendship Circle of WA
- Chabad of Central Cascades, Issaquah
- Chabad Jewish Russian Center
- Chabad of Kirkland - Center for Jewish Life, Kirkland
- Chabad of Snohomish County, Edmonds/Lynnwood
- Island Synagogue, Mercer Island
- Chabad of North Seattle, Lake City/Northgate
- Chabad of Evergreen State College and Olympia, Olympia
- Chabad Jewish Center of Renton, Renton/Kent/Auburn
- Chabad of Shoreline, Shoreline
- Chabad of Spokane County, Spokane
- Chabad of Pierce County, Tacoma
- Chabad of Queen Anne, Queen Anne/ Magnolia
- Chabad at UW, Seattle
- Chabad of Clark County, Vancouver
- Ashreichem Yisrael, Seattle
- Beth Israel, Aberdeen
  - Serves both Reform and Orthodox
- Bikur Cholim Machzikay Hadath Congregation, Seattle
  - A merger of several earlier congregations: Chevra Bikur Cholim, Yavneh Congregation, Seattle Congregation Machzikay Hadath
- Chai Center of Greater Seattle, Seattle
- Emanuel Congregation, Seattle
- Congregation Ezra Bessaroth, Seattle
- Minyan Ohr Chadash, Seattle, Modern Orthodox minyan meets for Shabbat and Yom Tov
- Sephardic Bikur Holim Congregation, Seattle
- West Seattle Torah Learning Center, Seattle
- Mercaz Seattle, North Seattle, Modern Orthodox minyan meets for Shabbat and Yom Tov
- Spokane Sephardic Center, Clayton, Orthodox minyan meets when groups are lodging for Shabbat and Yom Tov

=== Defunct ===
- Ahavath Ahim, Seattle
  - Founded by Marmara Jews, built a synagogue in 1922 at 17th and Fir. After 1929, lost members to Sephardic Bikur Holim (consequently known from 1929 into the 1960s as Sephardic Bikur Cholim-Ahavath Ahim) and to Congregation Ezra Bessaroth. Dissolved 1939.

== Reconstructionist ==
- Temple Beth Hatfiloh, Olympia
  - After being unaffiliated since its founding in 1937, the congregation officially aligned with Reconstructionism in 2000
- Chavurat Shir Hayam (also Renewal), Bainbridge Island
- Kadima Reconstructionist Community, Seattle
  - Founded in 1978 as a progressive Jewish social action group, it became a Reconstructionist congregation in 2005

== Reform ==
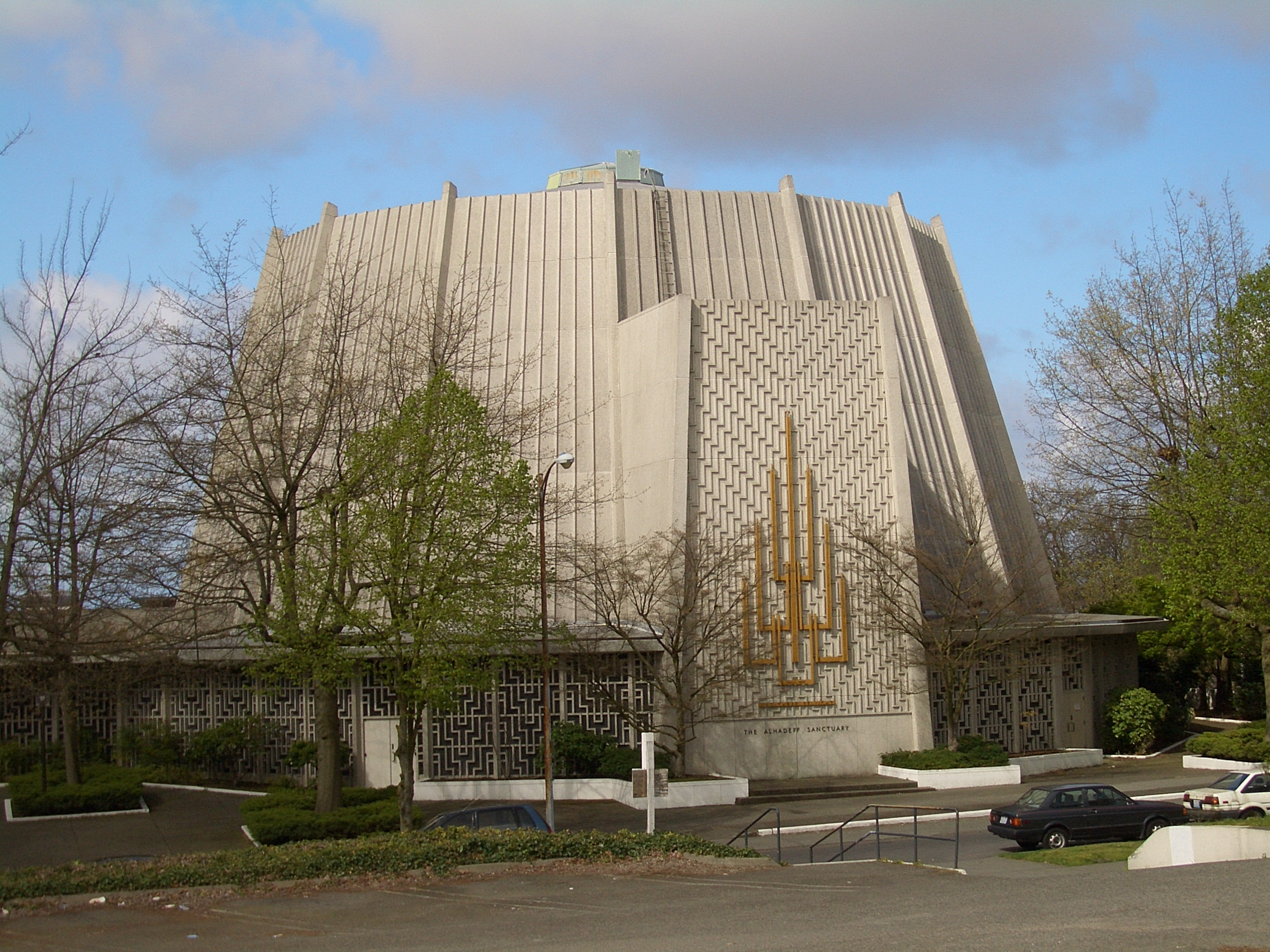
The Alhadeff Sanctuary of Temple De Hirsch Sinai

- Bet Chaverim Community Synagogue of South King County, Des Moines
- Temple Beth Am, Seattle
- Temple Beth El, Tacoma
  - This merges the earlier Temple Beth Israel and Sinai Temple. The latter, a Conservative congregation since 1938, traces back to the Orthodox Congregation Hevra Talmud Torah, founded 1909
- Congregation Beth Hatikvah, Bremerton
- Congregation Beth Israel, Walla Walla(formerly Congregation Beth Israel Myer Youdovitch Memorial, unaffiliated)
- Congregation Emmanu-El, Spokane (merger of Congregations Beth Haverim and Ner-Tamid in 2009)
- Temple Beth Israel, Aberdeen
  - An antecedent was the Grays Harbor Reform Hebrew Congregation that met in a F.O.E. hall 1913–1928. Serves both Reform and Orthodox
- Congregation Beth Israel, Bellingham
  - Founded 1906, officially affiliated as Orthodox 1908–1986, Reform since then
- Temple Beth Or, Everett
  - In 1987, Temple Beth Or absorbed the former Congregation Moses Montefiore, Orthodox
- Temple B'nai Torah, Bellevue
- Congregation Kol Ami, Vancouver
- Olympic B'nai Shalom Havurah, Port Angeles
- Temple De Hirsch Sinai, Seattle
  - This merges the earlier Temple De Hirsch, Seattle and Temple Sinai, Bellevue
- Kol HaNeshamah—West Seattle's Progressive Synagogue Community, Seattle
- Congregation Kol Shalom, Bainbridge Island (Note: Refers to as "Chavarat Kol Shalom", affiliated as a Reform Congregation since 1998.)
- Temple Shalom (Yakima

=== Defunct ===
- Temple Adath Israel, Centralia
  - Orthodox 1928–1950s, then Reform. Temple sold 1994
- Congregation House of Israel, Everett (defunct, 1915–1920)

== Renewal ==
- Congregation Eitz Or, Seattle
- Chavurat Shir Hayam (also Reconstructionist), Bainbridge Island
- Gonazaga Jewish Bulldogs Friday Night Service, Spokane at Gonzaga University

== Unaffiliated ==
- Bet Shira, Port Townsend
- Fort Lewis Jewish Chapel, Fort Lewis
- Havurat Ee Shalom, Vashon Island
- Hillel: Jewish Student Organization of WSU & UI, Pullman and Moscow, Idaho
- Jewish Community of the Palouse, Pullman and Moscow, Idaho
- Jewish Federation at Bastyr (JFAB, a Jewish student group at Bastyr University with campuses and Clinics in Kenmore, Washington, Seattle, Washington and San Diego, California
- Congregation Tikvah Chadashah, Seattle
  - A gay and lesbian congregation
- Greater Wenatchee Jewish Community (Wenatchee, Washington
  - Described by the Washington State Jewish Historical Society (WSJHS) as "a quasi-Reform temple," it was Seattle's first congregation (1889) and synagogue (1892)
- Kavana Cooperative, Seattle

=== Defunct ===
- Ohaveth Sholum Congregation, Seattle
