= Sephardic Bikur Holim Congregation =

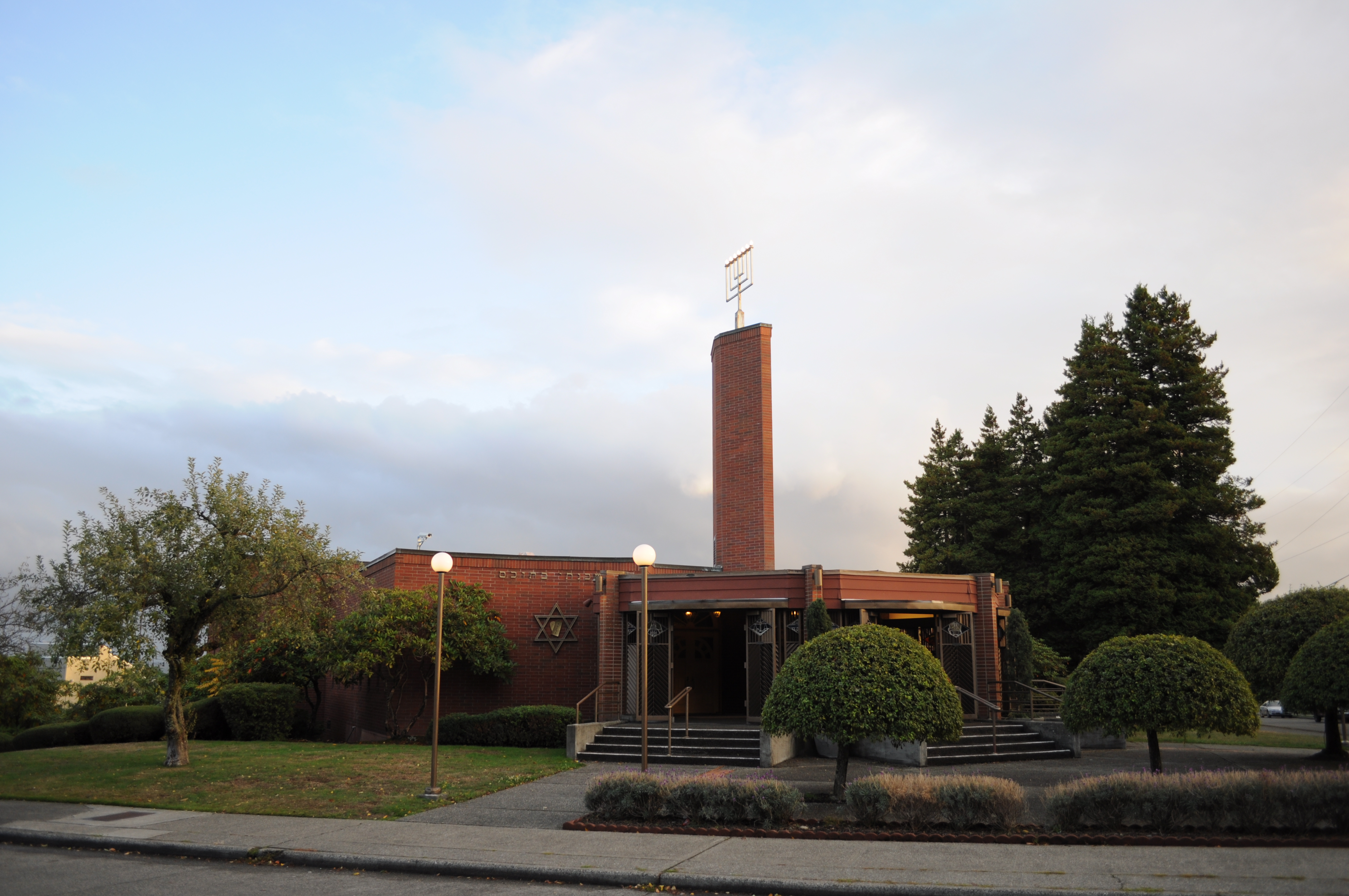
- The synagogue in 2009

- Location in Washington

Religion
- Affiliation: Orthodox Judaism
- Rite: Sephardic
- Ecclesiastical or organisational status: Synagogue
- Status: Active

Location
- Location: Seward Park, Seattle, Washington
- Country: United States
- Coordinates: 47°32′38″N 122°16′00″W

Architecture
- Architect: B. Marcus Priteca
- Type: Synagogue
- Established: c. 1902 (as a congregation)
- Completed: 1929 (20th Ave and E Fir St); 1965 (52nd Ave S and S Morgan St)

Website
- sbhseattle.org

Sephardic Bikur Holim Congregation (SBH) is an Orthodox Jewish congregation and synagogue in the Seward Park neighborhood of Seattle, in the US state of Washington, that practices in the Sephardic tradition.

== Overview ==
The name Bikur Holim (which can be transliterated various ways into English) means visiting or comforting the sick, an important mitzvah. The first official name of the congregation was Spanish Hebrew Society and Congregation Bikur Holim, shortened to "Sephardic Bikur Holim" ("Sephardic" to avoid confusion with Seattle's similarly named Ashkenazic congregation). For a time in the 1930s, after amalgamation with another congregation, it was known as Bikur Holim Ahavath Ahim Congregation.

SBH is one of Seattle's two Sephardic congregations, the other being Congregation Ezra Bessaroth. With about 4,000 Sephardim, Seattle is in contention with Miami for having the nation's third largest Sephardic population, behind New York City and Los Angeles. According to Aviva Ben-Ur, the influence of the Sephardim within the Jewish community has arguably been greater in Seattle than anywhere else in the United States. At their relative peak, Sephardic Jews constituted about one-third of Seattle's Jewish population; today, they constitute about ten percent. (another source says 18 percent); the Sephardic community in New York at the time made up less than 1 percent of that city's far more numerous Jewish Community; today, thanks to an influx of Syrian, Persian and Bukharian Jews, Sephardim make up a far larger portion of that metropolitan area's Jewry. Although both Seattle Sephardic congregations are Orthodox, many less observant members and even secular Jews attend, because they identify strongly with being Sephardic.

Roberta Noel Britt writes that the congregation got its name from its original synagogue in Seattle's Central District, the former synagogue of the (Ashkenazic) Bikur Cholim, now Bikur Cholim Machzikay Hadath, which was purchased in 1913. The congregation's own website says that the name was adopted from an identically named congregation in Tekirdağ, Turkey.

== History ==
=== Origins ===
Solomon Calvo and Jacob Policar, both from the island of Marmara arrived in Seattle in 1902, the first Sephardic Jews to arrive in that city. Nissim Alhadeff followed close behind, as did several Jews from the island of Rhodes. Calvo and Alhadeff both went into the seafood business, with the former founding the Waterfront Fish and Oyster Co. and the latter founding the Palace Fish and Oyster Co., later Pacific Fish Co. They and their fellow Sephardim dominated the fish and produce stands in the early years of Pike Place Market. By 1910, Seattle's Sephardim included some from Tekirdağ (also known as Rodosto) and Constantinople (now Istanbul). Most early arrivals were young men, but some soon brought wives. By 1910 the city had about 40 Sephardic families.

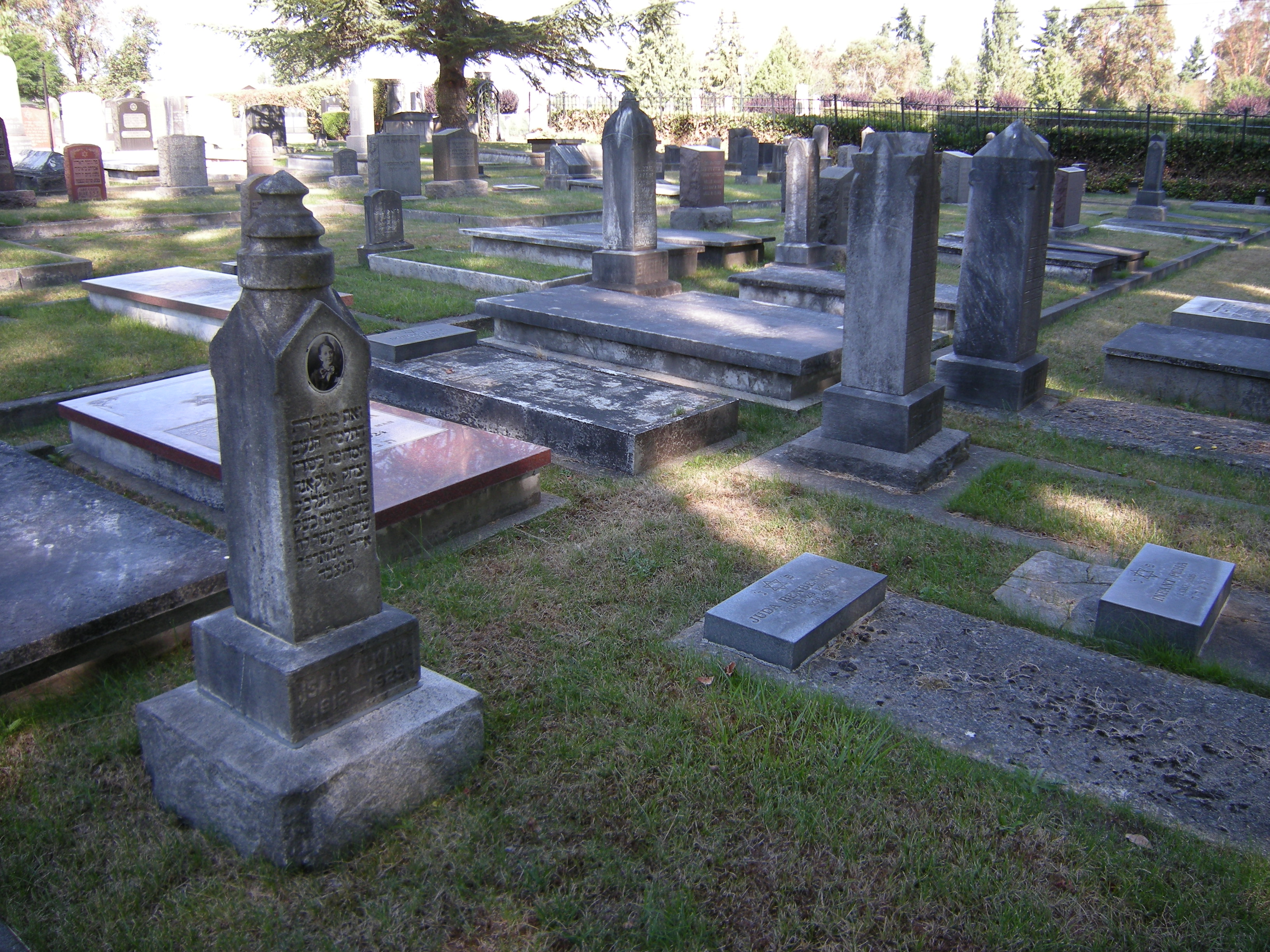
Seattle's Historic Sephardic Cemetery

The first Sephardic arrivals held services for the High Holy Days in a rented hall; an Ashkenazic rabbi came over to blow the shofar. After 1908 they split into two groups, one from Rhodes and one from the Turkish regions (Tekirdağ and Marmara), because of differences in minhagim (traditions). In 1911, the latter group purchased a Sefer Torah (torah scroll) from Palestine, and in 1913 raised $800 to buy the old 13th and Washington synagogue of the Ashkenazic congregation Bikur Cholim; the latter were moving to a synagogue at 17th and Yesler, now the Langston Hughes Performing Arts Center. They also purchased a section of the Bikur Cholim cemetery.

Rabbi Shelomo Azose, a hakham (Torah scholar) who had served in both Tekirdağ and Marmara, arrived in Seattle 1910; he became a combination rabbi, hazzan or cantor, mohel (performing circumcision), and shochet (kosher slaughterer of animals). He died in 1919; his brother, Isaac Azose, succeeded him 1919–1924.

In an effort to improve religious education, in 1915 SBH and other Seattle Sephardim formed a Sephardic Talmud Torah, with a Mr. Benezra from New York City as its first teacher. Benezra had a solid knowledge not only of Hebrew and English, but also of Ladino or Judaeo-Spanish, the traditional vernacular of Sephardic Jews.

By 1916 there were about 1500 Sephardim in Seattle. The Rhodes group had established a separate synagogue, Congregation Ezra Bessaroth. The Marmara group were also distinct, but lacked a synagogue of their own. World War I brought a further influx, mostly relatives of Sephardim already in Seattle, but some families left Seattle for Portland, Oregon and Los Angeles. In 1921, the Marmara group decided to build the Ahavath Ahim synagogue, completed 1922; some SBH members left to join them.

Also in 1921 Rabbi Chaim Nahum, former Hakham Bashi (Chief Rabbi of Turkey) visited Seattle to raise money for the Alliance Israélite Universelle. He remained in Seattle three weeks, and raised more money in Seattle than in Portland or Los Angeles.

=== Rabbi Abraham Maimon ===
In 1923, Rabbi Abraham Maimon, who claimed descent from Maimonides and who had been the rabbi in Tekirdağ when many of the SBH members had lived there, indicated his interest in moving to Seattle. The matter was complicated by the Emergency Quota Act of 1921 and the Immigration Act of 1924, but matters were worked through, and in September 1924 he became the congregation's new rabbi. That same year, the congregation's Ladies Auxiliary was founded, with Estraya Chiprut as its first president.

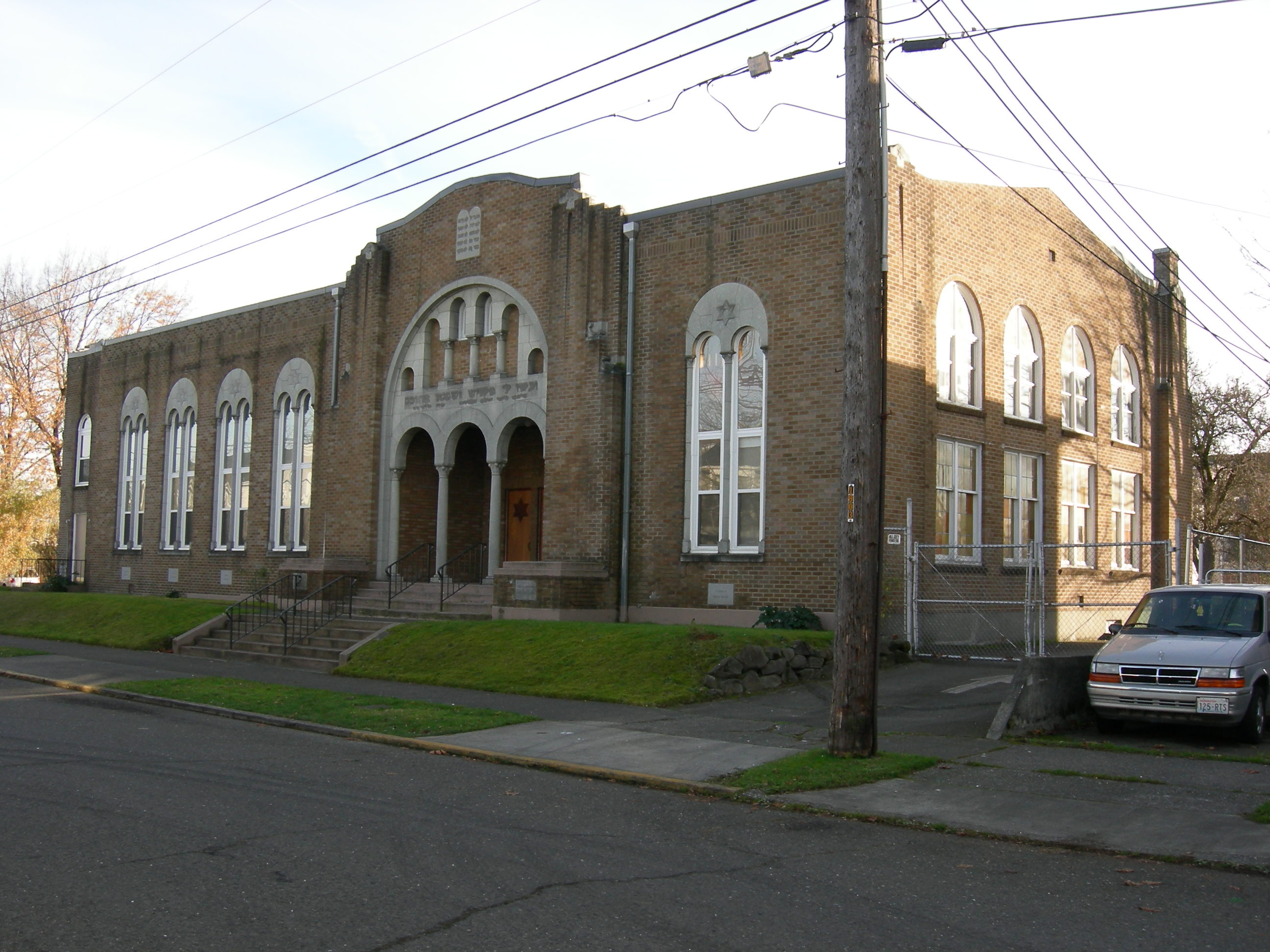
The 1928 synagogue of the Sephardic Bikur Holim Congregation, at 20th and Washington, is now the Tolliver Temple (Church of Christ).

Although Rabbi Maimon's tenure proved short—he died in January 1931—the congregation grew and prospered during those years. Attendance at the Shabbat services increased, and members of the congregation adopted stricter observance of Shabbat and of kashrut (kosher) practices. The congregation established the role of a gabbai to assist during services and a shamash to open and close the synagogue daily. Avram Barlia was to perform the latter function for over 50 years. In the days before the widespread availability of telephones, he went house to house, extending invitations for engagements, weddings, and so forth. SBH began to outgrow its facility at 13th and Washington and, in 1928, SBH bought a property at 20th Avenue and East Fir Street, and managed to raise the funds to build a synagogue in time for the 1929 Rosh Hashanah services. The new sanctuary was officially inaugurated Sunday, September 29, 1929.

Under Maimon, SBH began to heal the breach with the rival Sephardic synagogues. Representatives of congregations Ezra Bessaroth and Ahavath Ahim gladly accepted an invitation to participate in SBH's 1925 Fruticas (Tu Bishvat) celebration. The local Sephardic social welfare group Seattle Progressive Fraternity (SPF), founded in 1921, already had members from all three congregations, and held several meetings in 1926 to discuss unity in the Sephardic community. In 1927, the congregation elected as its president Henry Benezra, who in 1921 had become the first Sephardic Jewish graduate of the University of Washington. Benezra's central purpose in taking the office was to amalgamate the city's three Sephardic synagogues.

Benezra and Jack Caston got the SBH board's permission to attempt amalgamation with Congregation Ezra Bessaroth; the matter was discussed between the institutions for over half a year without finding a mutually acceptable basis to merge. The SPF and the local Jewish newspaper The Jewish Transcript would continue to discuss and urge amalgamation for many years, but without success.

Meanwhile, Rabbi Shabetai Israel left the Ahavath Ahim congregation in 1929, and they did not readily find a successor. The majority of the members of Ahavath Ahim voted in 1931 to amalgamate with SBH; a few joined Ezra Bessaroth and a smaller number decided to continue as an independent synagogue, with Morris Scharhon (who by now also operated the Talmud Torah) as their religious leader. For a time after this, SBH was known as Bikur Holim Ahavath Ahim Congregation; this was eventually shortened back to the original name.

=== The Depression and war years ===
After Maimon's death religious duties were divided between Nessim Azose and Bension Maimon, along with Rabbi Isaac Azose. Around 1931 SBH first introduced a choir, trained by Samuel E. Goldfarb, recently arrived music director of Seattle's Reform Jewish Temple De Hirsch. Goldfarb, co-composer of the Hanukkah song "I Have a Little Dreidel", trained the singers and composed and arranged their liturgical music.

The Great Depression was hard on the Sephardic Bikur Holim Congregation and Seattle's Sephardic community in general, as on so many others. In the 1920s, Seattle had seen a good deal of amateur theater performed in Ladino, and the plays even helped raise money for the Sephardic synagogues. This era came sharply to an end in 1929. The Sephardic Talmud Torah could no longer pay Morris Scharhon, who attempted for a while to operate a smaller cheder out of his home and functioned as hazzan (cantor) for Ahavath Ahim. Albert Levy, editor of the Ladino newspaper LaVara moved from New York in summer 1931, and temporarily reinvigorated the Talmud Torah, adding women's classes and gaining recognition from the broader Jewish community, but finances nonetheless deteriorated, and Levy returned to New York in 1934.

Because of Maimon's purported descent from Maimonides, the congregation and his surviving family drew considerable attention in 1935, the 800th anniversary of Maimonides' birth.

Until 1935, Seattle had three separate Sephardic men's social organizations, the aforementioned culturally oriented SPF, the Ahavath Shalom, and Shalom Alehem. Ahavath Shalom—affiliated with the Ezra Bessaroth congregation, and nicknamed the "Havurah de Huevos" (huevos being Spanish / Ladino for "eggs"), because part of the 10¢ weekly dues went for a hard-boiled egg on Shabbat—served the burial needs of the Sephardic community, and had, in the 1920s, significantly expanded the Sephardic cemetery in the 167th Street area. Shalom Alehem had originated to care for the sick, and became more or less a health insurance plan. In 1935, the three social organizations merged into the Seattle Sephardic Brotherhood, still active as of 2009.

Leaders of the Brotherhood continued to be enthusiastic about the possibility of amalgamating SBH with Ezra Bessaroth and the independent Ahavath Ahim Congregation, and they managed to get the congregations talking, but responses were lukewarm. Still, when leading Sephardic rabbi David de Sola Pool of New York's Spanish and Portuguese Synagogue proposed that Rabbi Isidore Kahan, onetime Rosh Yeshiva in Rhodes and at the time a rabbi in Rome would want to move to seattle, synagogues, SBH and Ezra Bessaroth agreed to sponsor him to serve as the rabbi of both synagogues. He arrived in March 1939.

Rabbi Kahan was fluent in Italian, German, Hebrew and Hungarian. Unfortunately, at the time of his arrival he spoke little English and, despite his time in Rhodes, little Ladino. His English rapidly improved, but he proved unequal to the difficult balancing act of attending to the needs of two congregations. In 1941, SBH gave him a cash payment to terminate his contract; he remained in Seattle as rabbi at Ezra Bessaroth.

The Ahavath Ahim synagogue closed down by 1940, becoming more of a social club. Morris Scharhon joined SBH as its hazzan, and Albert Levy headed a revived SBH Talmud Torah, which he once again revitalized.

During the 1920s and '30s, the Seattle's Sephardim remained concentrated in the Central District, between Jackson and Cherry Streets and between 14th and 26th Avenues. The increasingly Americanized children attended the local public schools, including particularly Garfield High School, where SBH's Victor Calderon, Israel Halfon, and Ezra Rose formed the nucleus of the 1930–31 Seattle champion basketball team. Few at this time went on to college, although Sephardic culture attracted the attention of anthropologists from the nearby University of Washington.

Over 100 members of the SBH congregation served in World War II (all men, except for two young women). For a time, there were almost no men between 18 and their early 30s present at services. SBH women participated sufficiently in home front activities as to be recognized by the Seattle Red Cross as a separate unit. Many older men participated as Civil Defense Administration wardens and deputy wardens, not an entirely nominal matter in a port city.

=== Solomon Maimon returns ===
Solomon Maimon, son of Abraham Maimon spent eight years studying at New York's Yeshiva University (YU), and returned to Seattle in 1944 an ordained rabbi, the first Sephardic rabbi ordained in the United States. Invited to speak from the pulpit at SBH, he "dazzled the congregants." He was almost immediately hired to be the congregation's first full-time rabbi since his father's death. Under his influence, more than 30 SBH members, of both sexes, would follow him to YU.

Speaking perfect English, and fluent not only in Ladino and Hebrew, but also in Yiddish (which he had learned for his Talmudic studies at YU) over the next four decades Solomon Maimon brought SBH into a new era, successfully balancing Sephardic roots and the claims of American modernity. He helped his congregation navigate such arcana of American society as properly filed marriage certificates and Social Security registration. The latter, in particular, was no small matter for Jews born in Turkey, whose only record of their birth was liable to be a Hebrew date noted in a family holy book.

Maimon returned for a shorter time to New York to study to be a mohel. He performed his first circumcision in 1947, and became the official mohel of Seattle's Jewish community. Faced with the weak state of Sephardic religious education in Seattle, he urged his congregation to attend the main Seattle Talmud Torah, then located at 25th and Columbia, which had trained teachers, and he played a significant role in the 1947 founding of the Seattle Hebrew Day School (now Seattle Hebrew Academy), an institution that bridged the divide between Sephardim and Ashkenazim. Initially, some congregants criticized the day school as smacking of a separationist movement, but SBH families proved to be among the school's main sources of students.

The G.I. Bill enabled, for the first time, a significant number of Seattle's Sephardim to pursue secular higher education. Many attended the university of Washington. The aftermath of World War II also brought a new group of Sephardic immigrants: Holocaust survivors from in or near Salonika, bilingual in Modern Greek and Ladino, a number of whom arrived in the early 1950s.

The death of Morris Scharhon, hazzan of SBH in 1950 brought the synagogue another round of struggle with immigration authorities. Samuel Benaroya, Sephardic hazzan in Geneva, Switzerland was interested in coming to the Americas, and, once again de Sola Pool in New York suggested Seattle and sent SBH a recording of Benaroya singing the Sephardic tefillot for the High Holy Days. However, the quota for Turkish-born immigrants was already full, and according to the government a special provision for rabbis did not apply to cantors (a distinction that made more sense in Ashkenazic tradition than Sephardic). Leo Azose, president of the SBH congregation, managed to get the assistance of Senator Warren G. Magnuson, and Benaroya and his wife and daughter arrived in Seattle in 1952. Benaroya was steeped in Sephardic musical traditional and brought about a major evolution both in the SBH choirs and in the passing on of both liturgical and other music, beginning what is now a widespread generation-spanning transmission of the hazanut at SBH.

In 1954 SBH introduced a sleep-away summer camp at site near Burton on Vashon Island, normally used as a Baptist church camp. Initially, campers went out for 3–4 days, but the program lengthened steadily, eventually to 10 days. By the 1970s, the camp was conducted jointly with Ezra Bessaroth, and began to be held in various locations throughout the Pacific Northwest. Eventually it evolved into the Sephardic Adventure Camp, independent of any particular synagogue.

=== The move to Seward Park ===
Although as late as the mid-1950s most of the SBH congregation remained in the Central District, the neighborhood was becoming increasingly African American, its Jews were becoming increasingly educated and prosperous, and most of the Jews were moving out, especially to the Eastside suburbs, Mercer Island in Lake Washington, and the south Seattle neighborhood of Seward Park. The Ezra Bessaroth congregation built a new building in Seward Park in 1957, and SBH members began to gravitate in the same direction.

Once again, around 1960, there was talk of amalgamation, but the Ezra Bessaroth congregation ultimately decided to remain separate. The 20th and Washington synagogue building was sold to Baptists (as of 2009 it is the Tolliver Temple, Church of God in Christ) and work began on the present sanctuary at 52nd Avenue South and South Morgan Street in Seward Park. There were hopes of having the synagogue complete for the High Holy Days of 1963, and then for the SBH's 50th anniversary in 1964, but things moved more slowly than that. Ground was broken June 7, 1964, and the synagogue designed by B. Marcus Priteca was inaugurated for the High Holy Days in 1965. Solomon Gaon, Sephardic Chief Rabbi of the British Empire, attended both the 50th anniversary celebration and the inauguration of the new synagogue. Gaon participated in the procession that carried the Torah scrolls from the old synagogue to the new, as did every Orthodox rabbi in Seattle.

There was also a further effort at a Sephardic religious school. The Ezra Bessaroth congregation had established a school in the late 1950s, and in 1963 the two congregations combined in an after-school Sephardic Religious School for the children of both congregations. The school operated with various degrees of success for 14 years, before disbanding in 1977.

=== Consolidation and passing the torch ===
In March 1971, the congregation began a newsletter called LaBoz, which has continued to this day; since 2000, it is available by email as eLaBoz. (It had been preceded by a short-lived SBH Congregation Bulletin during World War II, which was largely an effort to keep up links with the temporarily far-flung congregants in the military.) Sam (Bension) Maimon's columns from this newsletter were gathered in the 1993 book The Beauty of Sephardic Life.

The early 1970s also saw an increase in formal connection among Sephardic congregations in the United States, in which SBH participated strongly, sending some of the largest contingents to several national events. The American Sephardi Federation was established as a branch of the World Sephardi Federation. Both SBH and Ezra Bessaroth sent large groups to an American Sephardi Federation Youth Convention held in Atlanta, Georgia; for that occasion, Samuel Benaroya composed a new melody for the Birkat Hamazon (grace after meals), which soon became almost universally used by American Sephardim.

In 1975 the SBH constitution was changed to allow women to serve as members of the Board of Directors. In 1977–78, SBH congregant Dr. David Raphael made a documentary film Song of the Sephardi, about Sephardi ritual and music. The film largely focused on several religious ceremonies at Sephardic Bikur Holim on a single day, as well as a concert in Seattle by the Israeli singer Rivka Raz. In 1979, a second building was added near the Seward Park synagogue, the Sam H. Baruch Social Hall.

In 1982, after a five-year hiatus, Terry Azose of SBH and Dana Behar of Ezra Bessaroth revived the Sephardic Religious School for elementary school students. Classes were held twice a week at the Stroum Jewish Community Center on Mercer Island. This time, the school was a free-standing entity. The two Sephardic synagogues helped support the school, and in exchange their members received reduced tuition.

Benaroya announced that he intended to retire as hazzan in 1978, although he would continue to function in an emeritus capacity. After the usual immigration difficulties, Yitzhak Bahar came from Israel as a new hazzan. However, Bahar soon was diagnosed with a fatal cancer, and Benaroya informally resumed the position without pay. In 1985, the synagogue hired Frank Varon, a Seattle native and a student of Benaroya's who had been serving as a hazzan in the New York City area.

As Maimon approached his fortieth anniversary as the rabbi of SBH, he, too, decided it was time for him to retire. His successor was Simon Benzaquen of Maracaibo, Venezuela. Born in the Spanish North African enclave of Melilla, he had studied from the age of fourteen in England, where he served in the rabbinate for a decade before moving first to Venezuela and then to Seattle.

=== The Benzaquen/Varon era ===
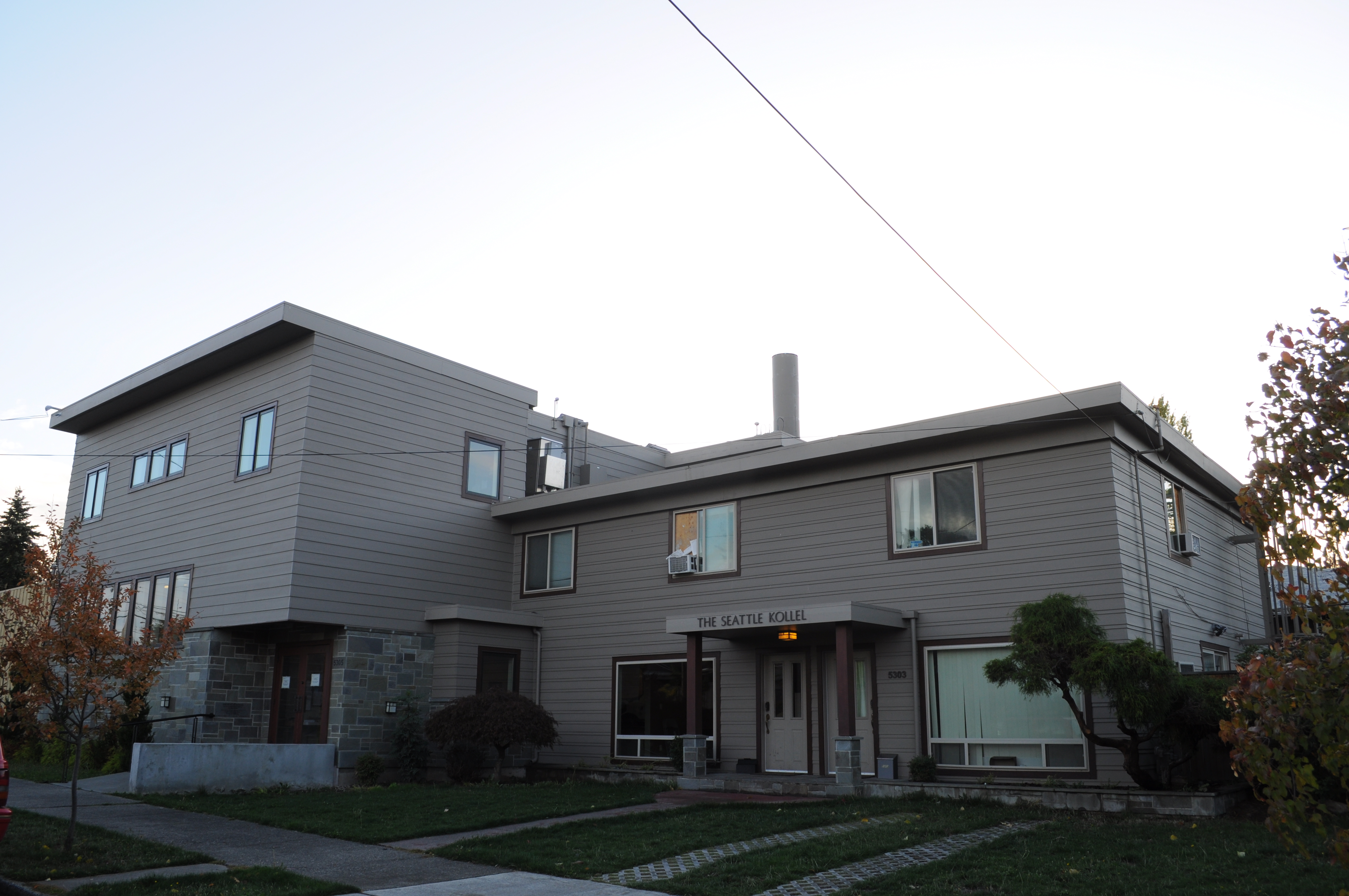
Seattle Kollel

As of 2009, more than a quarter century after his retirement, Maimon remained Rabbi Emeritus of SBH. Solomon Maimon has also remained active, including serving as an interim rabbi for several smaller Sephardic congregations around the U.S. In the early 1990s he worked with several of his family members and others to establish the Seattle Kollel (institute for advanced Jewish studies). Both he and Benzaquen were founding members in of Seattle's Va'ad HaRabanim (Committee of Rabbis), which replaced the former Seattle Kashrut Board. It continues the older organization's supervision of kosher food, but also provides a Bet Din (Jewish court) for Seattle.

Also as of 2009, Simon Benzaquen and Frank Varon remain, respectively, rabbi and hazzan of SBH. Benzaquen has received certification as a mohel in 1987 and certification in 2003 from the Jerusalem rabbinate as a dayan or judge, capable of arranging gittin (religious bills of divorce). He is also a sofer (Torah scribe) and a noted calligrapher of Ketubot (marriage contracts). Varon released a CD of Sephardic folkloric tunes, Mi Alma ("My Soul") in 1997, and was ordained a rabbi in 1999.

Samuel Benaroya, who died in 2003 at the age of 95, also recorded a CD: Ottoman Hebrew Sacred Songs (1998), one of the few recordings of Ottoman Hebrew sacred music. At the time of his death, Edwin Seroussi of Hebrew University called him "perhaps the last representative of a 400-year-old tradition of Turkish Jewish cantors who were experts in the singing of liturgical music according to Ottoman court music."

The Seattle chapter of the American Sephardi Federation (ASF), which includes members from both SBH and Ezra Bessaroth, hosted the 1989 ASF national meeting May 28–30, 1989 at Seattle's Westin Hotel. Over 600 Sephardim attended. Shlomo Ben-Ami, Israeli ambassador to Spain, was the keynote speaker, and among the panelists were news correspondent Wolf Blitzer and Carlos Rizowy, an authority on international law. SBH congregants also played important roles in 1996 when Seattle hosted both the annual meeting of Jewish Federations from throughout the U.S. and Canada and a meeting of the National Society for Hebrew Day Schools. The latter event included a Shabbat service during which SBH played host to 50 rabbis.

In 1992, Seattle's Sephardic Jews commemorated the 500th anniversary of the expulsion of the Jews from Spain with a procession from the Ezra Bessaroth synagogue to SBH, where they held memorial prayers, readings, addresses by the rabbis of the two congregations and a lecture by scholar Eugene Normand.

For many decades, SBH used traditional Hebrew-English prayer books compiled by Rabbi David de Sola Pool. Since 1995, SBH has taken advantage of computer technology to publish its own religious books that more precisely meet its needs. The first was a Passover Haggadah in Hebrew, Ladino and English, followed by a Selichot booklet, containing the penitential poems and prayers used in the month of Elul (before Rosh Hashanah) and the Days of Awe between Rosh Hashanah and Yom Kippur. In 2002, SBH, together with Congregation Ezra Bessaroth, published their own prayer books, the Siddur Zehut Yosef, the Seattle Sephardic Community Daily and Shabbat Siddur, corresponding precisely to their own requirements and indicating explicitly the differences in their order of services (with the Ezra Bessaroth variations designated as "R" for "Rhodes" and SBH's as "T" for "Turkish"). All of the prayers are transcribed in both Hebrew and English on facing pages, as well as some in Ladino. Since that time, they have published several abridged Siddurim and others that are specific to particular holidays.

== Recent events ==
In an antisemitic incident in September 2009, the synagogue was defaced with Nazi graffiti.
