= Seward Park, Seattle =

Seward Park
- Seattle Neighborhood
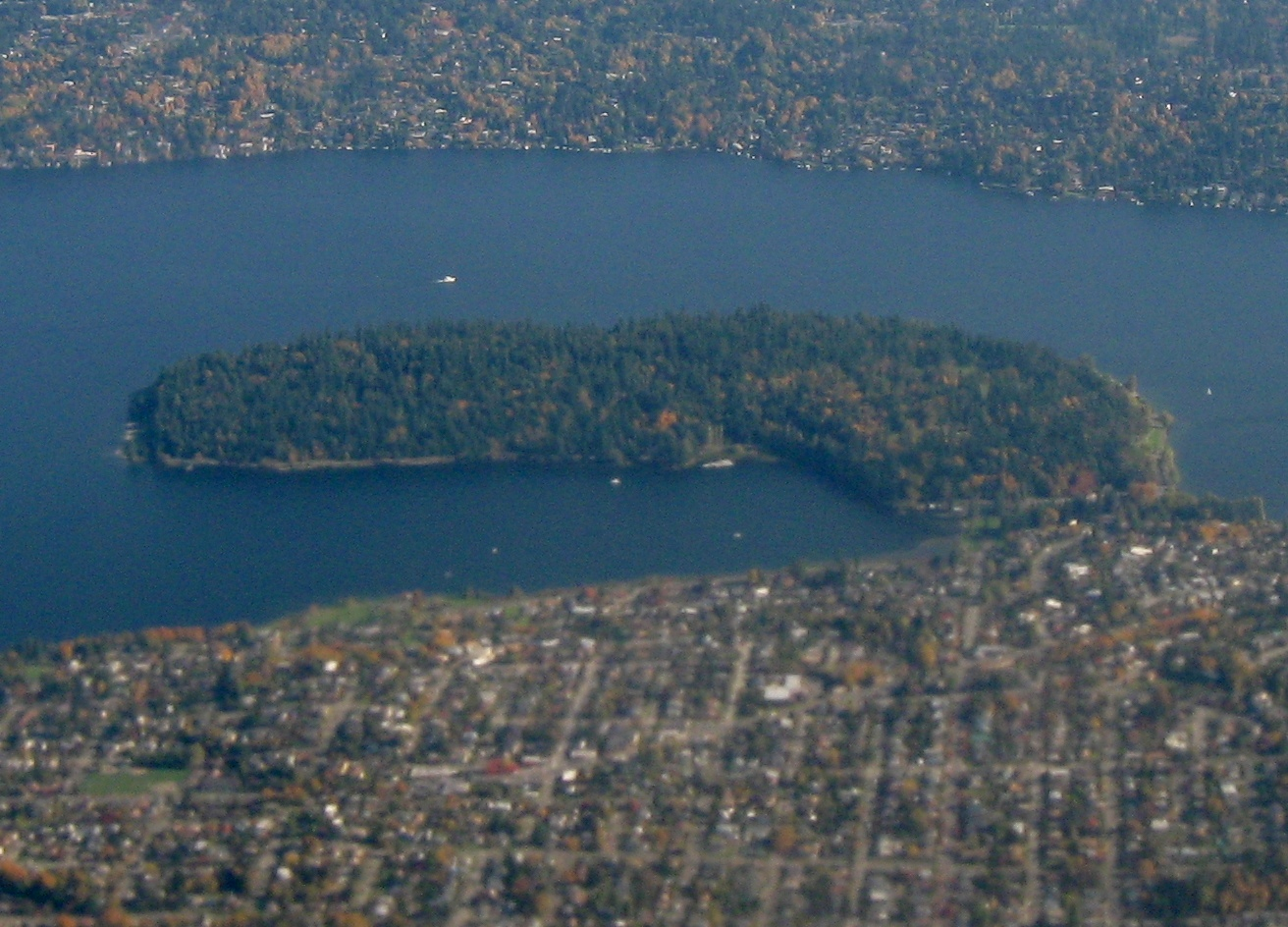
- Aerial view of Seward Park area from the west featuring forested Bailey Peninsula in Lake Washington, with Mercer Island on top.

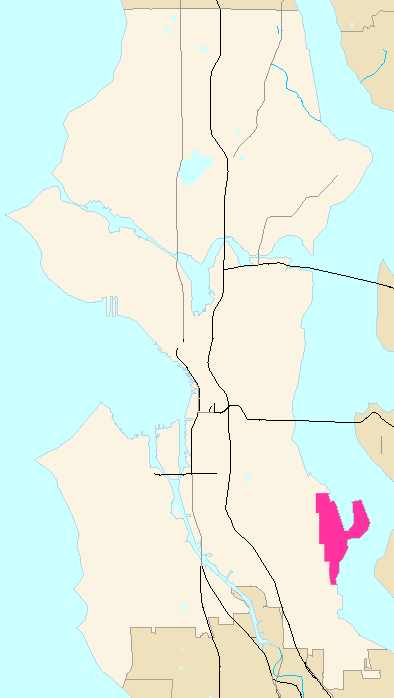
- Map of Seward Park's location in Seattle
- Coordinates: 47°33′02″N 122°15′52″W

Seward Park is a neighborhood in southeastern Seattle, Washington, just west of Seward Park. It is part of Seattle's South End. The park occupies all of Bailey Peninsula.

== Neighborhood ==
The neighborhood is bounded on the east and north by Lake Washington, on the south by South Kenyon Street, and on the west by the eastern boundaries of Columbia City, one of Seattle's oldest neighborhoods.

== Environment ==
The 300 acres (121 ha) of Seward Park has about a 120 acre (48.6 ha) surviving remnant of old-growth forest, providing a glimpse of what some of the lake shore looked like before the growth of the city of Seattle. With trees older than 250 years, the Seward Park forest is relatively young (the forests of Seattle before the city were fully mature, up to 1,000–2,000 years old). The park's trees largely consists of softwoods, mostly Douglas firs, but with other species present as well, including Western hemlock, Pacific madrona and Alaskan cedar.

One of the earliest settlers, E. A. Clark, was influential in the life of Cheshiahud, a young man at the time, the mid-1850s.

The Seward Park neighborhood includes what may be one of the highest residential hills in Seattle (the hill is traversed by Graham Street near its high point, thus earning it the name "Graham hill"). In a series of annexations, the neighborhood joined the City of Seattle in 1907.

== Education ==
Although no schools fall within the borders of the neighborhood as described on city maps, three public schools, Graham Hill and Hawthorne and Dunlap elementary schools serve the area's students. In addition the alternative Orca K-8 lies within blocks of the neighborhood's boundary.

== Jewish Community ==
Seward Park is home to the largest concentration of Orthodox Jews in the Seattle area. Established after the Jewish community of the Central District relocated en masse in the early 1960s, the eruv-bound neighborhood has five synagogues and a Kollel, and its main thoroughfare becomes a family parade on Shabbat and holidays. The state’s oldest Ashkenazi Orthodox congregation, Bikur Cholim Machzikay-Hadath (BCMH), runs a campus that includes the local mikveh, a summer camp, and the girls’ high school Derech Emunah. Seward Park also contains two congregations - Sephardic Bikur Holim, which follows Turkish tradition, and Congregation Ezra Bessaroth, from the Island of Rhodes - which anchor Seattle’s Sephardic population, the third largest community in the country.

== See also ==
- Seattle before the city
- Seward Park
