= Ohaveth Sholum Congregation =

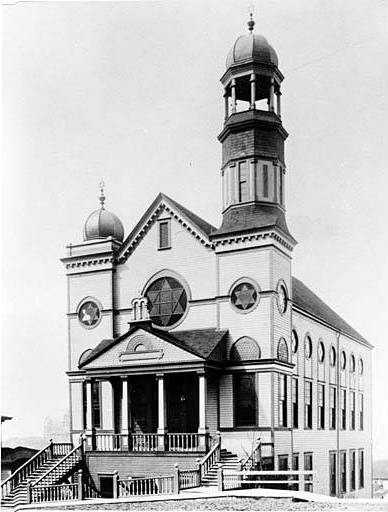
- An image of the former synagogue, taken between 1892 and 1897

Religion
- Affiliation: Reform Judaism (former)
- Ecclesiastical or organizational status: Synagogue (1892 – 1896)
- Status: Closed and demolished

Location
- Location: 8th Avenue and Seneca Street, Seattle, Washington
- Country: United States

Architecture
- Architect: Herman Steinman
- Type: Synagogue
- Founder: David Kaufman
- Established: 1889 (as a congregation)
- Completed: 1892
- Demolished: c. 1900

Ohaveth Sholum Congregation (alternate spellings: Ohaveth Shalem, Ohaveth Shalom) was the first synagogue in Seattle, Washington, in the United States.

Described by the Washington State Jewish Historical Society (WSJHS) as "a quasi-Reform temple," it was the Seattle's first Jewish congregation. It fell four days short of having the first synagogue in Washington.

== History ==
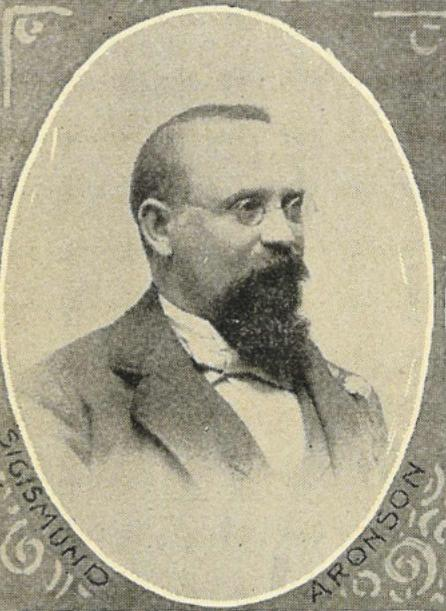
Sigismund Aronson, president of the congregation. The photo dates from about 1900, after the congregation dissolved.

The congregation, whose name means "lovers of peace," was established either on July 25, 1889 or August 25, 1889. In either case, that would make it the first Jewish congregation in Seattle. Most of the congregation had immigrated from either Germany or Poland and had already spent several decades in the American West. By now rather assimilated to American ways, they adopted the Reform prayerbook Minhag America, used both English and Hebrew in their services, seated both sexes together, and followed Congregation Emanu-El in San Francisco by using an organ during services. They observed each holiday for a single day, rather than the two days observed by the Orthodox.

In 1890, Congregation Ohaveth Sholem purchased a building on the corner of Seneca and Eighth Avenue for $8,500. The plan to build a Moorish style synagogue by 1891 did not materialize, but the congregation did receive a Torah scroll, which David Kaufman purchased in New York.

Prior to constructing a synagogue, the congregation met at Wickstrom Hall at 8th Avenue and Columbia Street on First Hill. Sigismund Aronson, secretary-treasurer of the prominent Seattle wholesaler Schwabacher Brothers, was congregation president. Other prominent members of the congregation, were Bailey Gatzert, Seattle's first (and, as of 2008, still only) Jewish mayor, also associated with Schwabacher Brothers, Jacob Furth, a banker and a key figure in the creation of Seattle's infrastructure for water and electricity, and David Kaufmann

The second synagogue, at the same location on First Hill, was designed by Herman Steinman, and constructed in the Gothic Revival style, similar to Congregation Emanu-El in San Francisco. The building seated 750 and opened on September 18, 1892, four days after Reform Temple Emanu-El in Spokane, making the latter the first synagogue in Washington. The Spokane congregation later merged into Beth Shalom, Spokane.

Ohaveth Sholum Congregation also had a cemetery (established 1889) on Queen Anne Hill. The congregation disbanded 1895 or 1896, and the building was foreclosed upon. The cemetery passed first into the hands of the Seattle Hebrew Benevolent Society and later (in 1910) Temple De Hirsch, later merged into Temple De Hirsch-Sinai.

Congregation Ohaveth Sholem financially collapsed as a result of the Panic of 1893. The employed rabbi departed in 1896 followed by the selling of the synagogue to pay off the congregation's creditors. By 1899, many of the more liberal Ohaveth Sholem members formed Temple De Hirsch.
