= Temple De Hirsch Sinai =

Jewish congregation with synagogues in Seattle and Bellevue, Washington, US

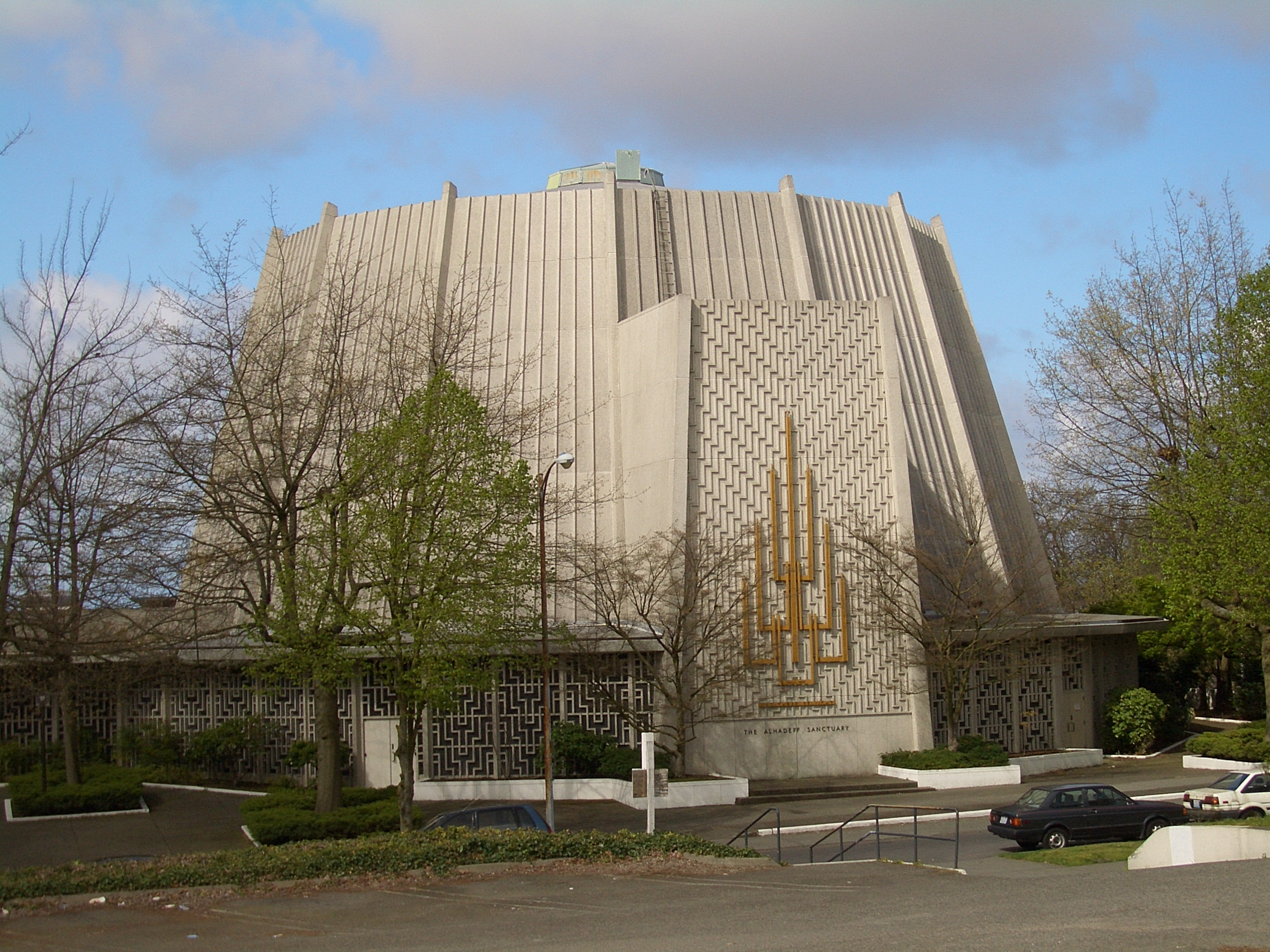
- The Alhadeff Sanctuary of Temple De Hirsch Sinai, in Seattle.

Religion
- Affiliation: Reform Judaism
- Ecclesiastical or organisational status: Synagogue
- Leadership: Rabbi Daniel Weiner
- Status: Active

Location
- Location: 1441 16th Avenue, Seattle, Washington 98122; 3850 156th Ave SE, Bellevue, Washington 98006
- Interactive map of Temple De Hirsch Sinai
- Coordinates: 47°36′50″N 122°18′43″W (Seattle); 47°34′30″N 122°07′58″W (Bellevue)

Architecture
- Established: 1899 (initial congregation); 1971 (merged congregations)
- Completed: 1960 (Seattle); 2001 (Bellevue)

Website
- templedehirschsinai.org
- Temple De Hirsch Sinai (Washington (state))

Temple De Hirsch Sinai is a Reform Jewish congregation with synagogues at campuses in Seattle and nearby Bellevue, Washington, in the United States. The congregation was formed as a 1971 merger between the earlier Temple De Hirsch (Seattle, founded 1899) and Temple Sinai (Bellevue, founded 1961) and is the largest Reform congregation in the Pacific Northwest.

The old Temple De Hirsch building (or Old Sanctuary) was listed on the National Register of Historic Places, but was demolished in 1993. Part of the façade remains.

== Temple De Hirsch ==
When Seattle's "quasi-Reform" Ohaveth Sholum Congregation, founded 1889, disbanded because of financial hardships after the Panic of 1893, Seattle's liberal Jews were left without a synagogue. Temple De Hirsch was founded as a specifically Reform synagogue in 1899, named after Jewish philanthropist Baron Maurice de Hirsch.

Construction of a synagogue was begun at Boylston Avenue and Marion Street in Seattle. A cornerstone was laid in 1901, and a basement was built; the congregation held services in the vestry, but rapid growth of the congregation led to the construction of a larger building at Union Street and 15th Avenue.

Construction on the new Temple De Hirsch designed by Seattle-based architect Julian F. Everett was begun in 1907, completed in 1908, and dedicated on the congregation's ninth anniversary, May 29, 1908. An adjacent Temple Center opened in 1924, housing a religion school and other organizations; a wing was added in 1951.

This temple building was demolished in 1993 after an unsuccessful attempt to work out a way to repurpose it as an arts venue. That effort did, however, end up salvaging a different former religious building: Seattle's Fourth Church of Christ, Scientist, now Town Hall Seattle.

The current sanctuary at 16th Avenue and Pike Street—the opposite corner of the same block as the old temple—was completed in 1960. That current building was designed by B. Marcus Priteca, John Detlie, and John Peck. Priteca was a noted theater architect: he designed all of Alexander Pantages' theaters between 1910 and 1929, as well as the landmark Seattle synagogue, Chevra Bikur Cholim (1912), now the Langston Hughes Performing Arts Center.

A Ladies Auxiliary (now the Women of Reform Judaism) was formed within months of the congregation's founding; a Temple Men's Club (now the Men of Reform Judaism) followed in 1920.

The first rabbi of Temple De Hirsch was Theodore Joseph from Lancaster, Pennsylvania. His successor, Samuel Koch, was senior rabbi from 1906 to 1942. During Koch's time, Temple De Hirsch solidified its position as an important and steadily expanding congregation, with a religion school attended not only by children of the congregation but by some whose parents were not Reform Jews. In 1909, Koch established a newsletter, Temple Tidings, initially a weekly and later a monthly (currently bi-monthly) publication.

Upon Koch's retirement, he was succeeded by Raphael H. Levine, who served as senior rabbi from 1942 to 1970. Levine was a devoted ecumenicist, co-hosting a television program called Challenge with a Catholic priest and a Protestant minister. Challenge aired for 14 years, first on KOMO-TV and later on KING-TV, both in Seattle. Rabbi Levine also founded the Pacific Association of Reform Rabbis, the ecumenical Camp Brotherhood, a religious, educational, and cultural center for Christians and Jews, and co-founded Camp Swig, an educational and recreational camp for Jewish youth, and played a significant role in the expansion of Children's Orthopedic Hospital, now Seattle Children's.

Rabbi Levine's successor, Earl S. Starr, was senior rabbi from 1970. He saw through the merger of congregations and remained senior rabbi of Temple De Hirsch Sinai until 2001. Like all of his predecessors at Temple De Hirsch, he carried on a long tradition of community service and outreach.

Temple De Hirsch has at least two claims to fame in the history of music. Samuel E. Goldfarb, co-composer of the Hanukkah song "I Have a Little Dreidel" was music director of Temple De Hirsch from 1930 to 1968. Using a farm system that allowed youth to "graduate" from one level of choir to another, he created one of the country's finest temple choirs. Perhaps more unusually, Jimi Hendrix played his first professional gig as a musician in the Temple De Hirsch basement; he was fired mid-performance for his wild playing.

Temple De Hirsch Sinai retained both the Temple De Hirsch facility (its "Seattle Campus") and the Temple Sinai facility (its "Bellevue campus"). The original Bellevue facility was sold in 2001, when a new facility was constructed in the Eastgate area of Bellevue. Rabbi Starr served as senior rabbi until his retirement in July 2001, when he was succeeded by Daniel A. Weiner, who currently holds the position. The Seattle building shares facilities with a local private school, the Seattle Academy of Arts and Sciences, and the Bellevue facility shares facilities with the Emerald Heights Academy.

== Libraries ==
The Temple De Hirsch Sinai Libraries were founded in 1908 and continue to provide a wealth of information for the congregation and community. In both Seattle and Bellevue sites, the system contains over 10,000 books, periodicals and CDs, with a specialty in materials on Judaism, history, culture, holiday and the Holocaust. The Benjamin Zukor Children's Library composes about one third of the total library collection and is spread over both library sites. It contains fiction and non-fiction for children and teens.

== Gallery ==
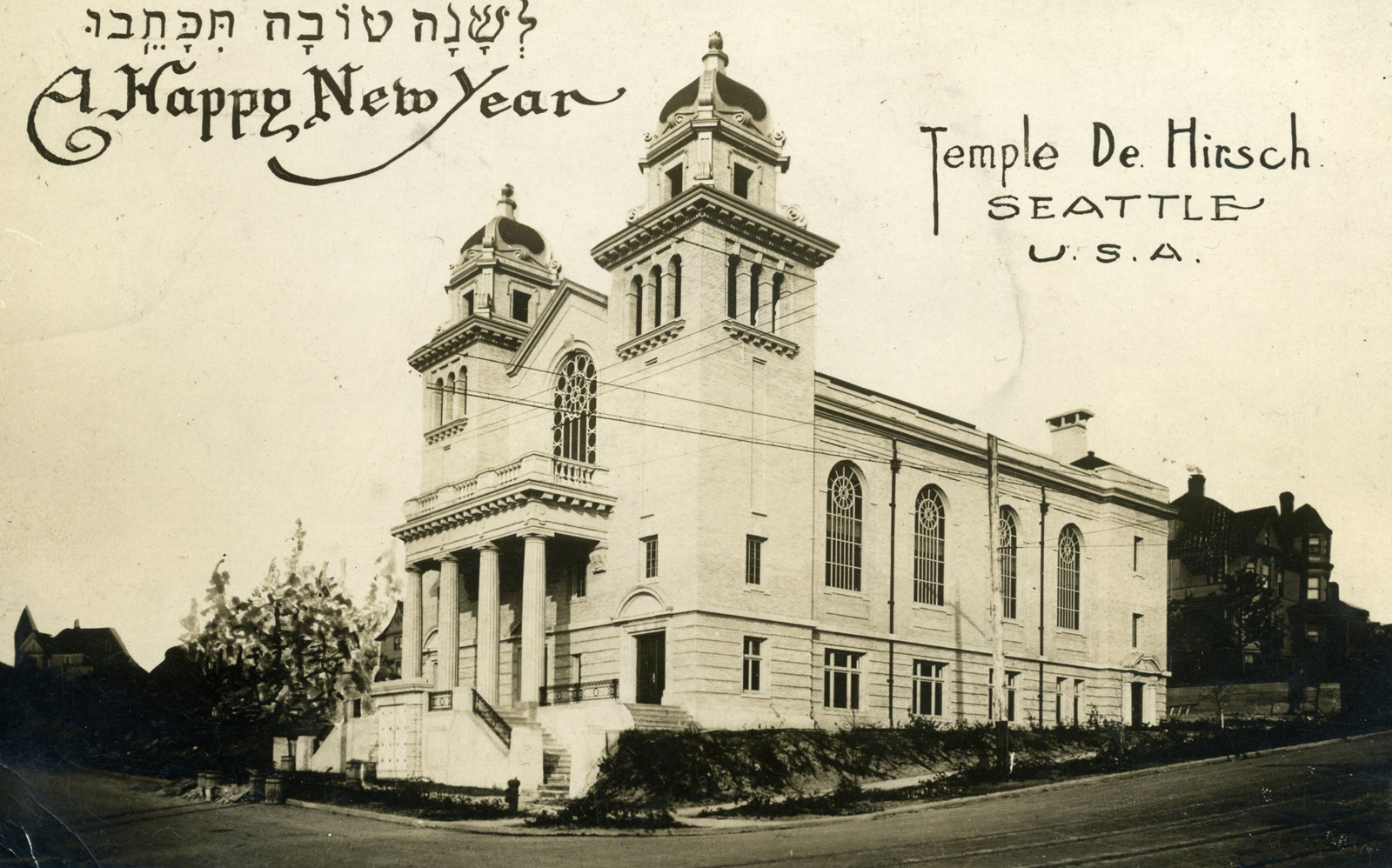
This Jewish New Year card, circa 1908, features the original, then-new, Temple De Hirsch. Although listed on the National Register of Historic Places, it was demolished in 1993.

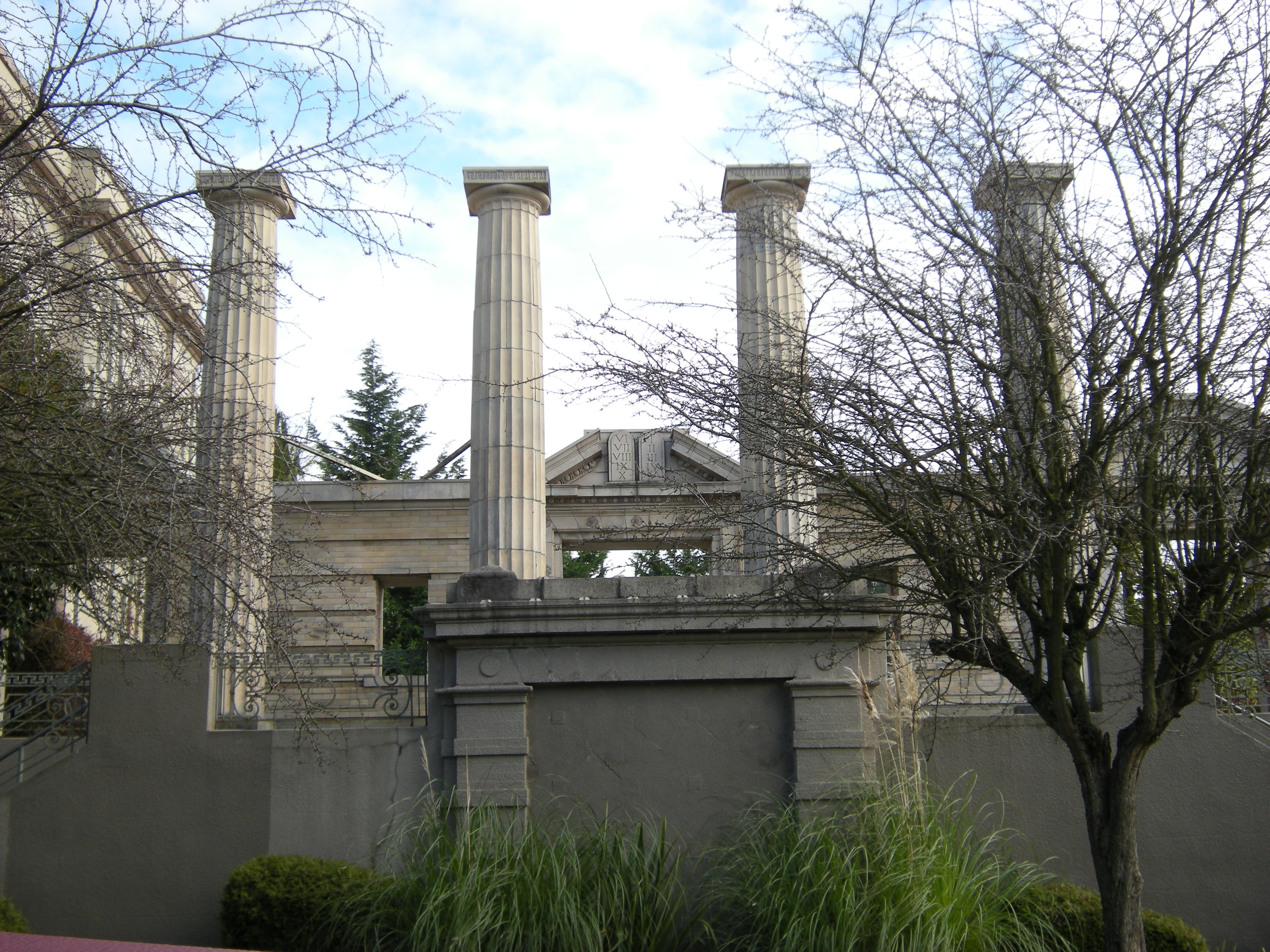
Remains of the old temple in 2008.

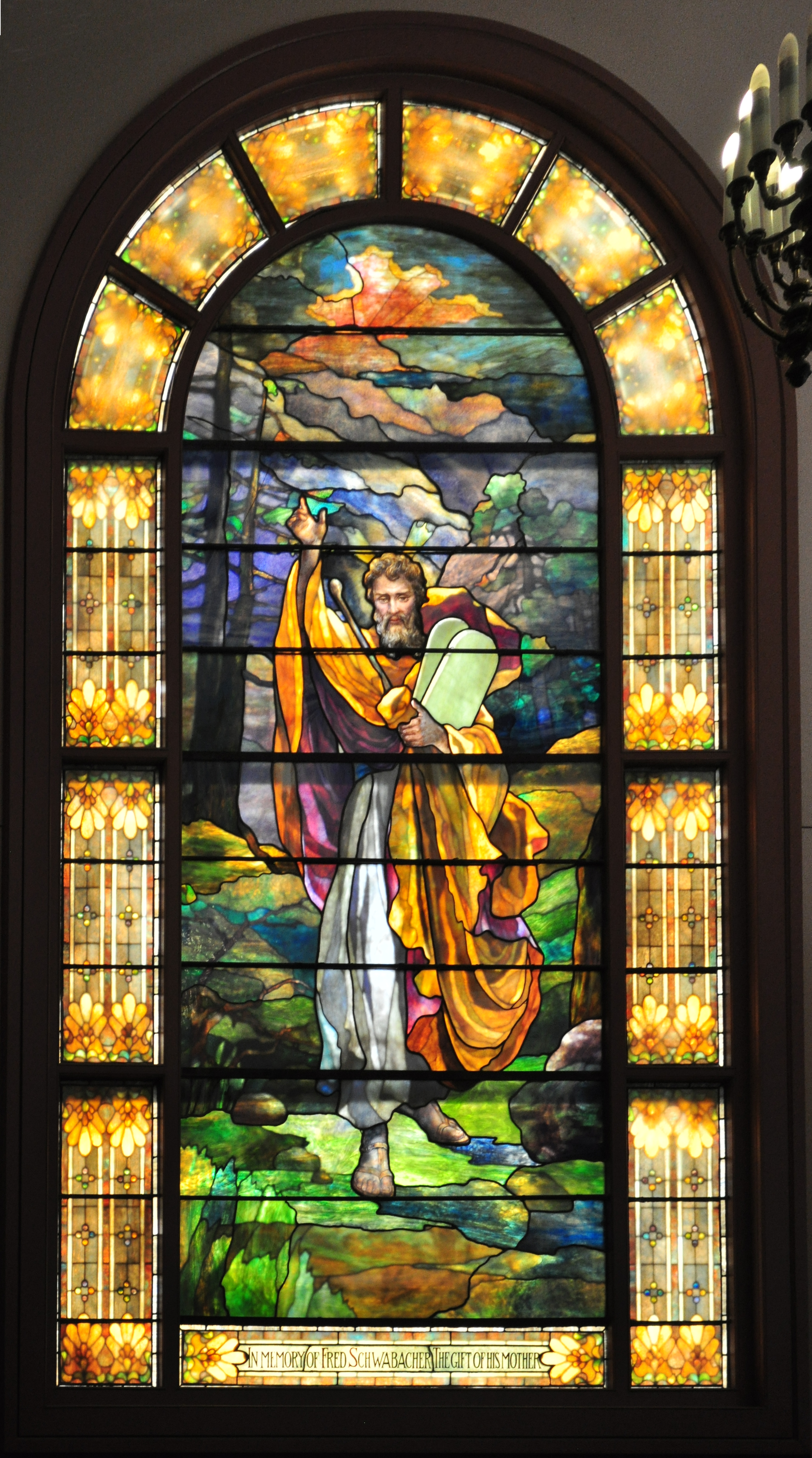
This stained glass window depicting Moses with the Tablets, now on the western side of the Schoenfeld-Gardner Chapel of Temple De Hirsch Sinai, Seattle, was salvaged from the 1908 Temple De Hirsch, where it was located on the east end, over the Ark and Torah. The text at the bottom says "In memory of Fred Schwabacher the gift of his mother".

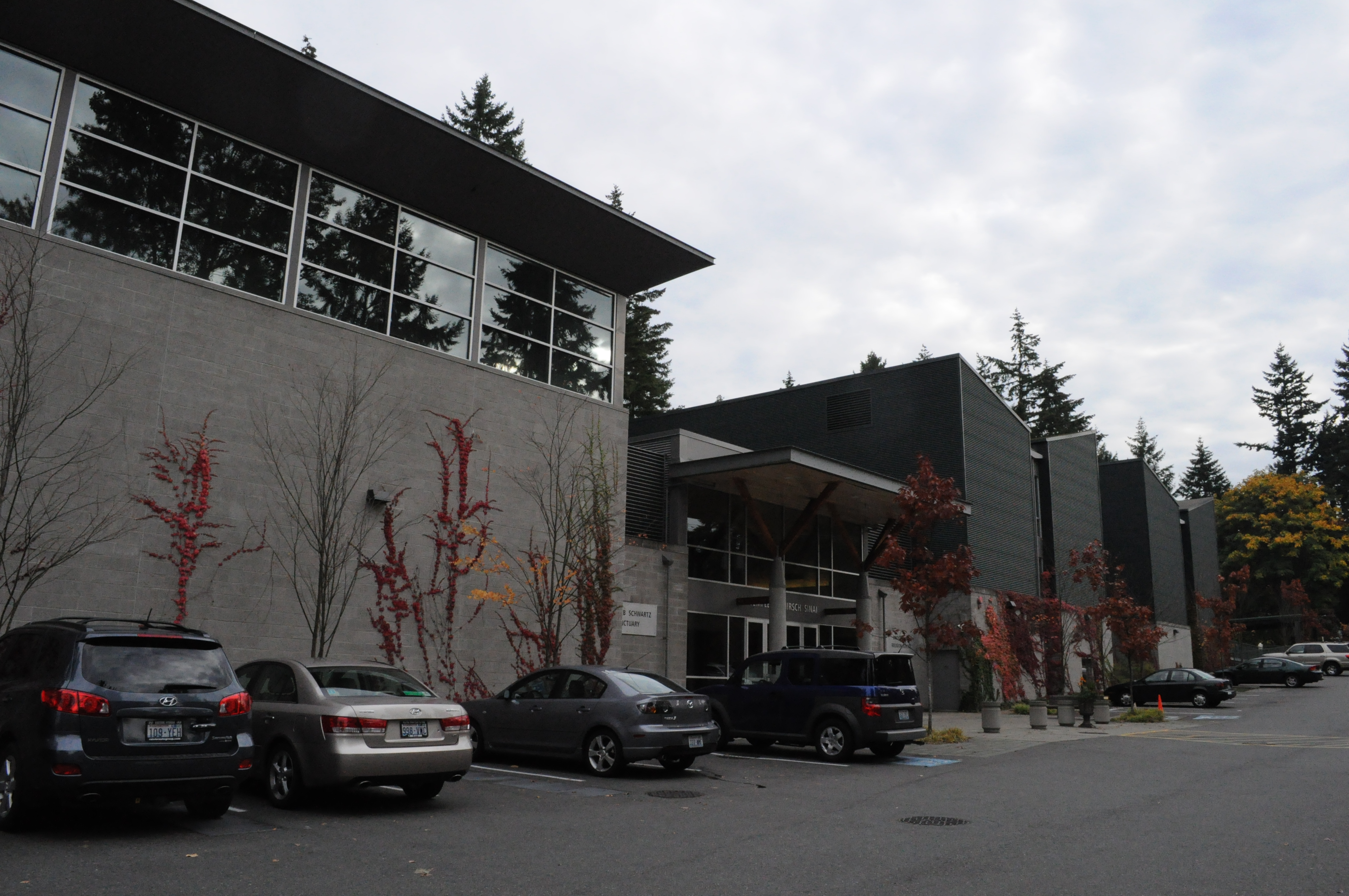
Temple De Hirsch Sinai Bellevue campus in 2009.

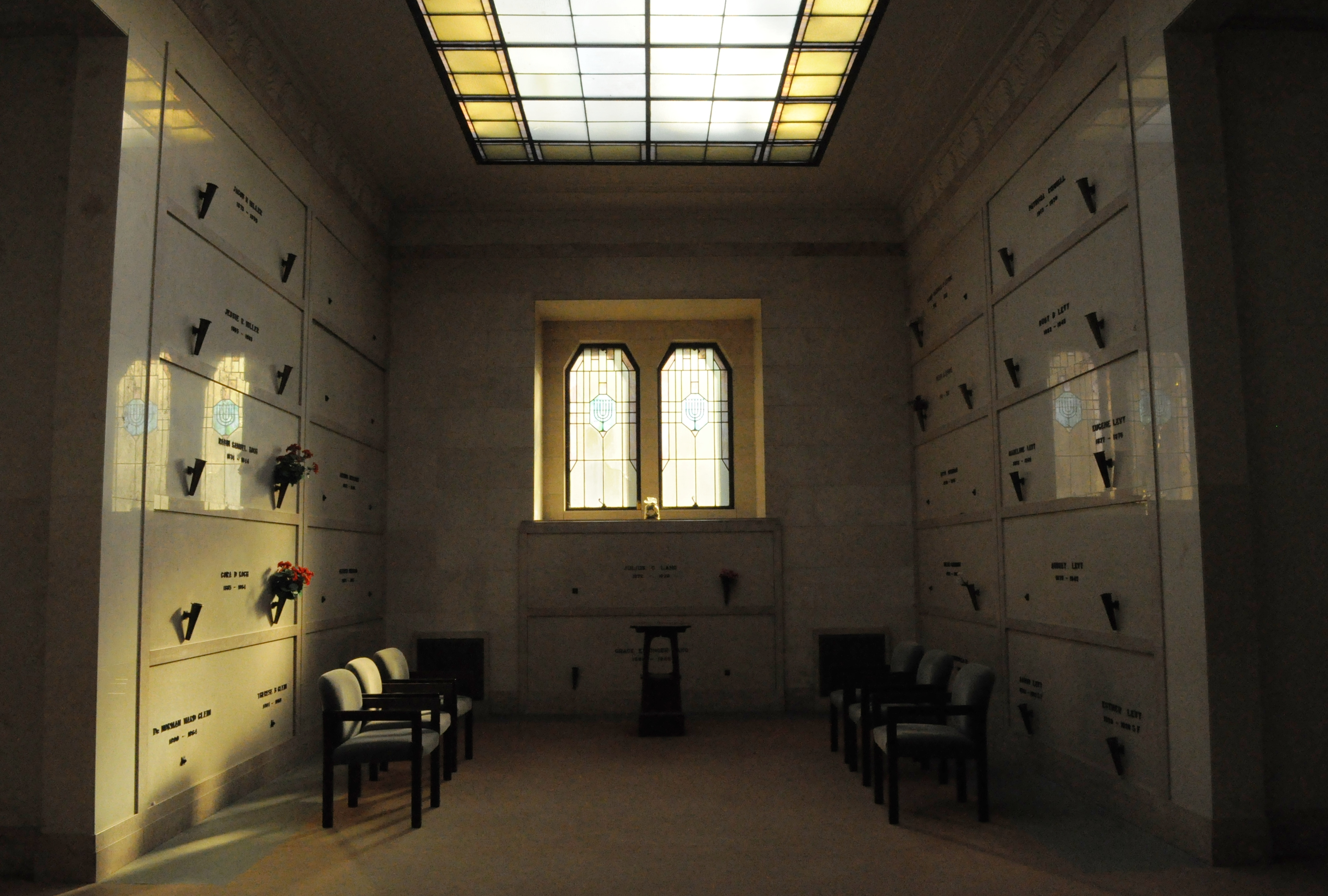
Interior, Home of Peace Mausoleum, Mt. Pleasant Cemetery, Queen Anne Hill, Seattle, Washington.
