= Congregation Ezra Bessaroth =

Orthodox synagogue in Seattle, Washington

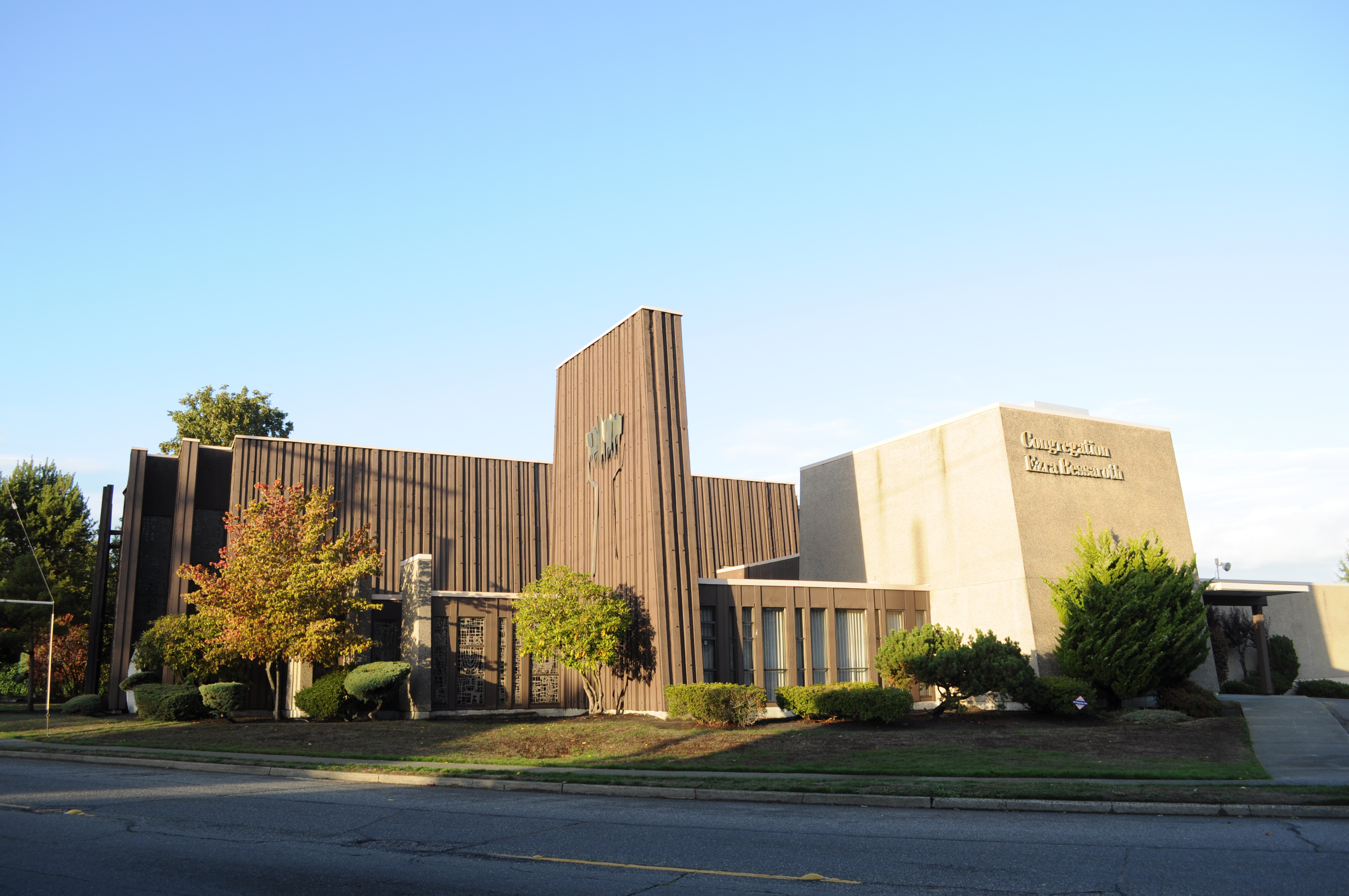

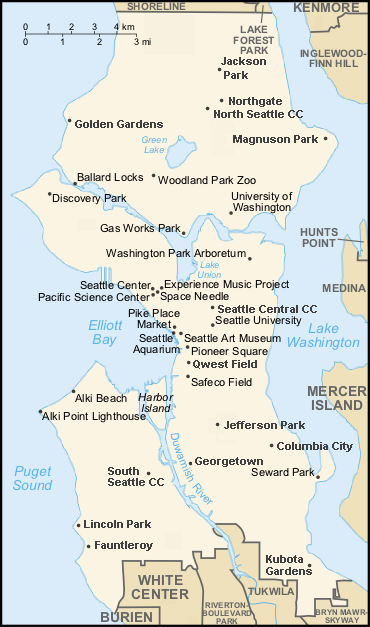
- Location in Seattle

Religion
- Affiliation: Orthodox Judaism
- Rite: Sephardic
- Ecclesiastical or organizational status: Synagogue
- Leadership: Rabbi David Benchlouch
- Status: Active

Location
- Location: 5412 Wilson Avenue South, Seward Park, Seattle, Washington 98118
- Country: United States
- Interactive map of Congregation Ezra Bessaroth
- Coordinates: 47°33′10″N 122°16′02″W

Architecture
- Established: June 19, 1914 (as a congregation)
- Completed: 1958

Website
- congregationezrabessaroth.shulcloud.com

Congregation Ezra Bessaroth is an Orthodox Jewish congregation and synagogue located at 5412 Wilson Avenue South, in the Seward Park neighborhood of Seattle, Washington, in the United States.

Established in 1914, Ezra Bessaroth is one of Seattle's two Sephardic congregations, the other being Sephardic Bikur Holim Congregation. Ezra Bessaroth maintains the liturgy and customs of the Mediterranean Island of Rhodes.

== Leadership ==
=== Rabbis ===
The following individuals have served as rabbi of Congregation Ezra Bessaroth:

Ordinal	Rabbi	Term start	Term end	Time in office	Notes
1	Isidore Kahan^{[note 1]}	April 25, 1939	May 1959	20 years	
2	Abraham Shalem	May 1959	November 1962	3 years, 6 months	
3	William Greenberg	September 1962	1990	27–28 years	
4	Yamin Levy	1990	2000	9–10 years	
5	Salomon Cohen-Scali	September 2001	December 2009	8 years, 3 months	
6	Ron-Ami Meyers	August 2011	July 2018	6 years, 11 months	
7	David Benchlouch	July 2022	incumbent	4 years, 1 month	

=== Cantors ===
Yogev Nuna was cantor of Ezra Bessaroth for several years.

Isaac Azose was chazan of Ezra Bessaroth from March 1966 to the end of 1999. He has published several siddurim for the needs of the Sephardic Jewish communities.

== Notes ==
- ^1: Also served as rabbi for Bikur Holim.
