= Langston Hughes Performing Arts Institute =

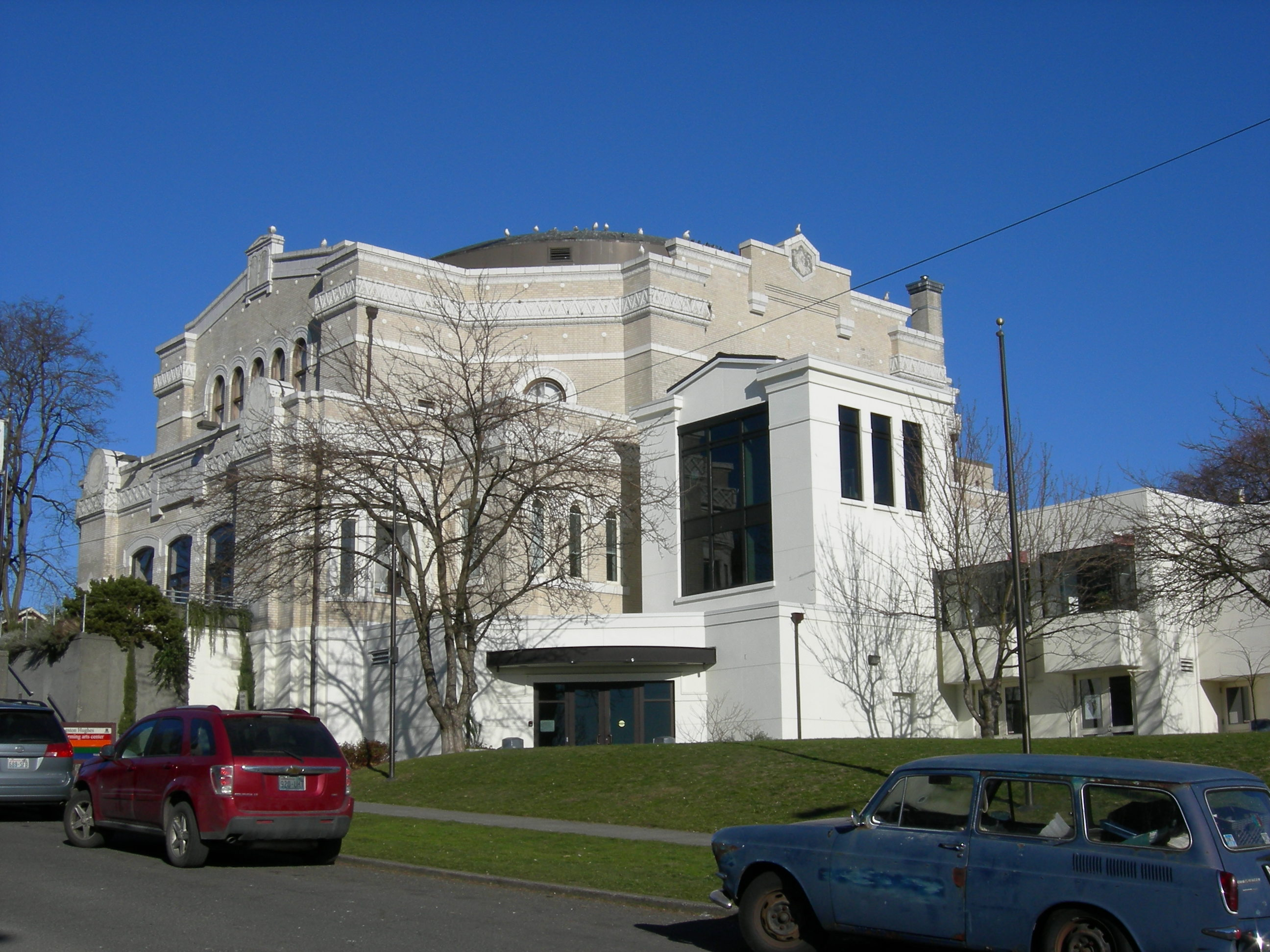
- Langston Hughes Performing Arts Institute, viewed by the southwest, in 2007

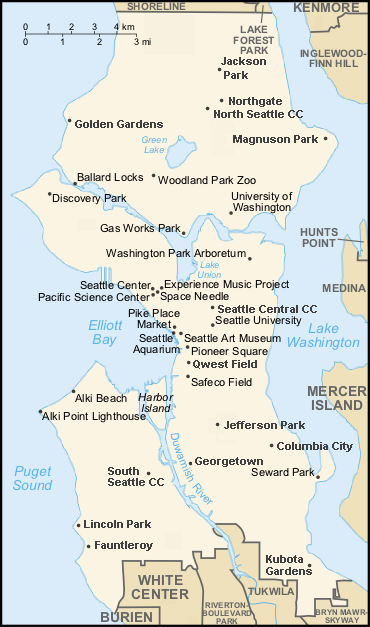
- Location in Seattle
- Former names: Yesler-Atlantic Community Center; Langston Hughes Cultural Center; Langston Hughes Cultural Arts Center; Langston Hughes Performing Arts Center
- Address: 104 17th Avenue South; Central District Seattle, Washington 98144; United States
- Coordinates: 47°36′05″N 122°18′36″W
- Owner: City of Seattle
- Type: Theater; Arts center
- Events: African American art, artists, and audiences

Chevra Bikur Cholim
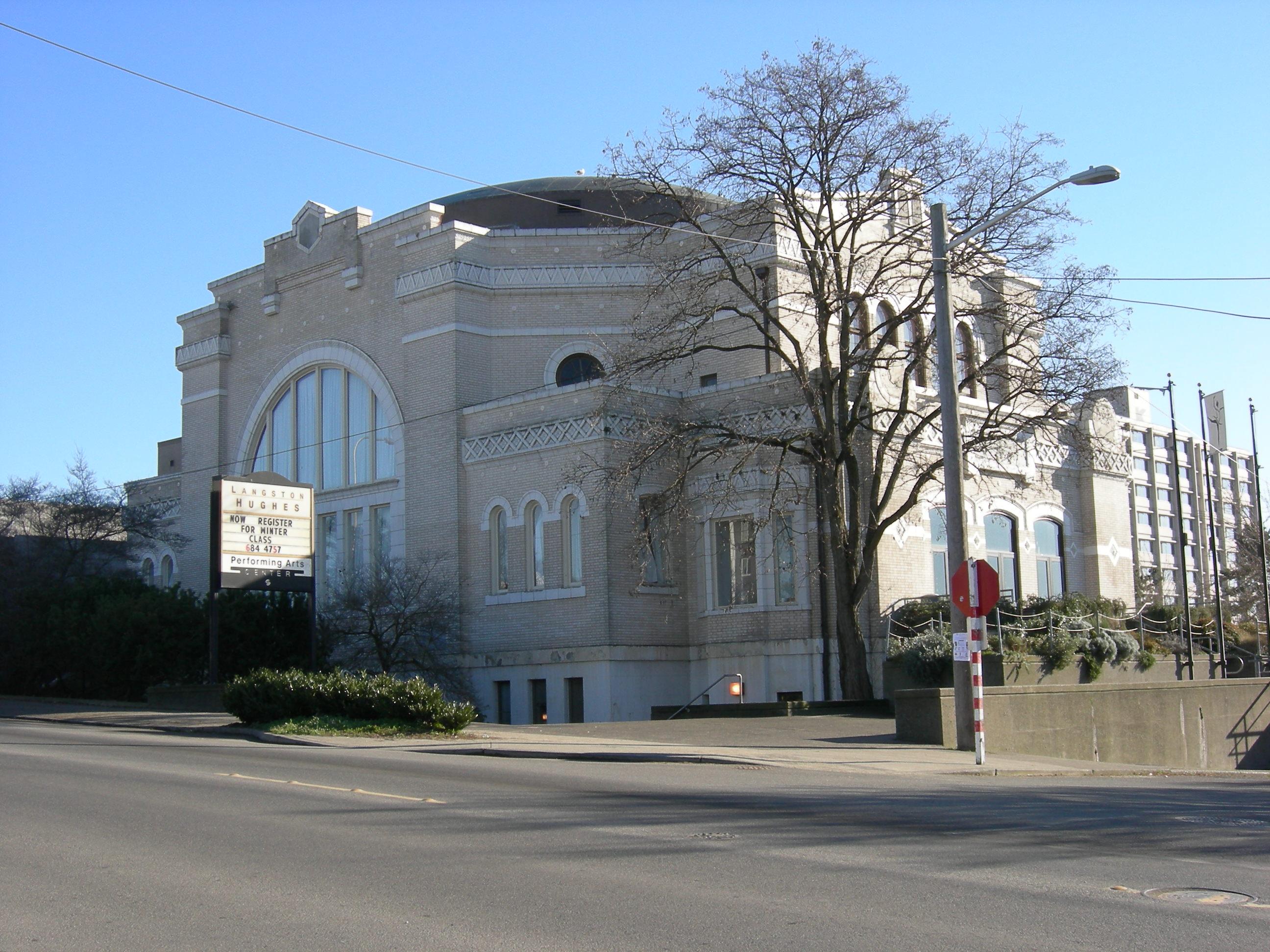
- The former synagogue

Religion
- Affiliation: Orthodox Judaism (former)
- Ecclesiastical or organisational status: Synagogue (1915 – 1969)
- Status: Closed and deconsecrated

Location
- Location: 104 17th Avenue South, Central District Seattle, Washington
- Interactive map of Chevra Bikur Cholim
- Coordinates: 47°36′05″N 122°18′36″W

Architecture
- Architect: B. Marcus Priteca
- Type: Synagogue
- Style: Byzantine Revival
- Completed: 1915

The Langston Hughes Performing Arts Institute is a cultural, artistic, and educational center for community that focuses on Black and African American art, artists, and audiences. The center is located at 104 17th Avenue South, in the Central District of Seattle, Washington, in the United States. It is owned and operated by the City of Seattle, and serves as the headquarters for the eponymous LANGSTON Seattle and Central District Forum (CD Forum), both non-profit organizations.

Constructed as a synagogue in 1915, designed by Marcus Priteca, the Jewish congregation sold the building to the City of Seattle in 1969, and following refurbishment, was repurposed as an arts centre. The center is named in honour of Langston Hughes, an author and leader of the Harlem Renaissance. The building is designated as a Seattle landmark.

The building was previously known as the Yesler-Atlantic Community Center, the Langston Hughes Cultural Center, The Langston Hughes Cultural Arts Center, and the Langston Hughes Performing Arts Center.

== Building history ==
The Byzantine Revival style synagogue, completed in 1915, was designed by B. Marcus Priteca for the Orthodox Jewish congregation Chevra Bikur Cholim, now Bikur Cholim Machzikay Hadath. Priteca completed his plans for the building in early 1913; the synagogue was dedicated in August 1915. The lower story of the addition on the south side of the building dates from 1961, the upper story from 1971. Priteca is the architect of many theaters in the United States.

The congregation sold the building to the City of Seattle in 1969, originally under the Model Cities Program. It became part of Parks and Recreation in 1972. The interior of the auditorium was renovated in 1971: a balcony area was removed, extending auditorium seating further back. In 1991 an addition was made to the east side of the auditorium, as well as seismic retrofit improvements; another addition was made to the southwest corner of the auditorium in 2003. The additions to the building have been for office and support spaces, and to provide barrier-free access.

== Organizational history ==
Langston Hughes Performing Arts Center was founded in 1969, originally under the Model Cities Program. The city purchased the building in 1971, intending it to house the city's first African-American theater, Black Arts/West, and a minority film training center, Oscar Productions. However, the renovations at that time took so long that those organizations found other quarters. Still, the institute became "Ground Zero" for Seattle's hip hop scene and played a comparable role for local African American theatrical talent.

From its inception into the early 21st century, LHPAI had "a split personality" as a "rec center for neighbor kids and families," strongly associated with Seattle's African American community, [that] also has aspired to be an arts organization, where serious actors, dancers and poets perform and train." Deriving its funds from the city—an unusual situation for a Seattle arts organization—meant it was free of concerns about meeting payroll and paying rent. However, it also led to a mandate that, in the words of former institute coordinator Steve Sneed, could emphasize "arts and crafts, not high-quality arts."

In 2001, the Parks and Recreation gave the institute a mandate to move more strongly toward the latter goal. LHPAI's artistic director, Jacqueline Moscou began an "ambitious" program to train young actors in 2004. Concerns were expressed during the transition that LHPAC might lose its "open-door, neighborhood feel" and that "the African-American focus will be diluted." The latter concern came, in part, because the Parks Department brought in Manuel Cawaling, an Asian American, as the institute's managing director.

Moscou, an African American, was placed on administrative leave in October 2007 after several accusations that she had "made racially offensive and intimidating comments to and about her Asian-American colleagues". She was reinstated at the beginning of March 2008, after a "public outcry."
