= Bikur Cholim Machzikay Hadath =

Orthodox Jewish synagogue in Seattle, Washington

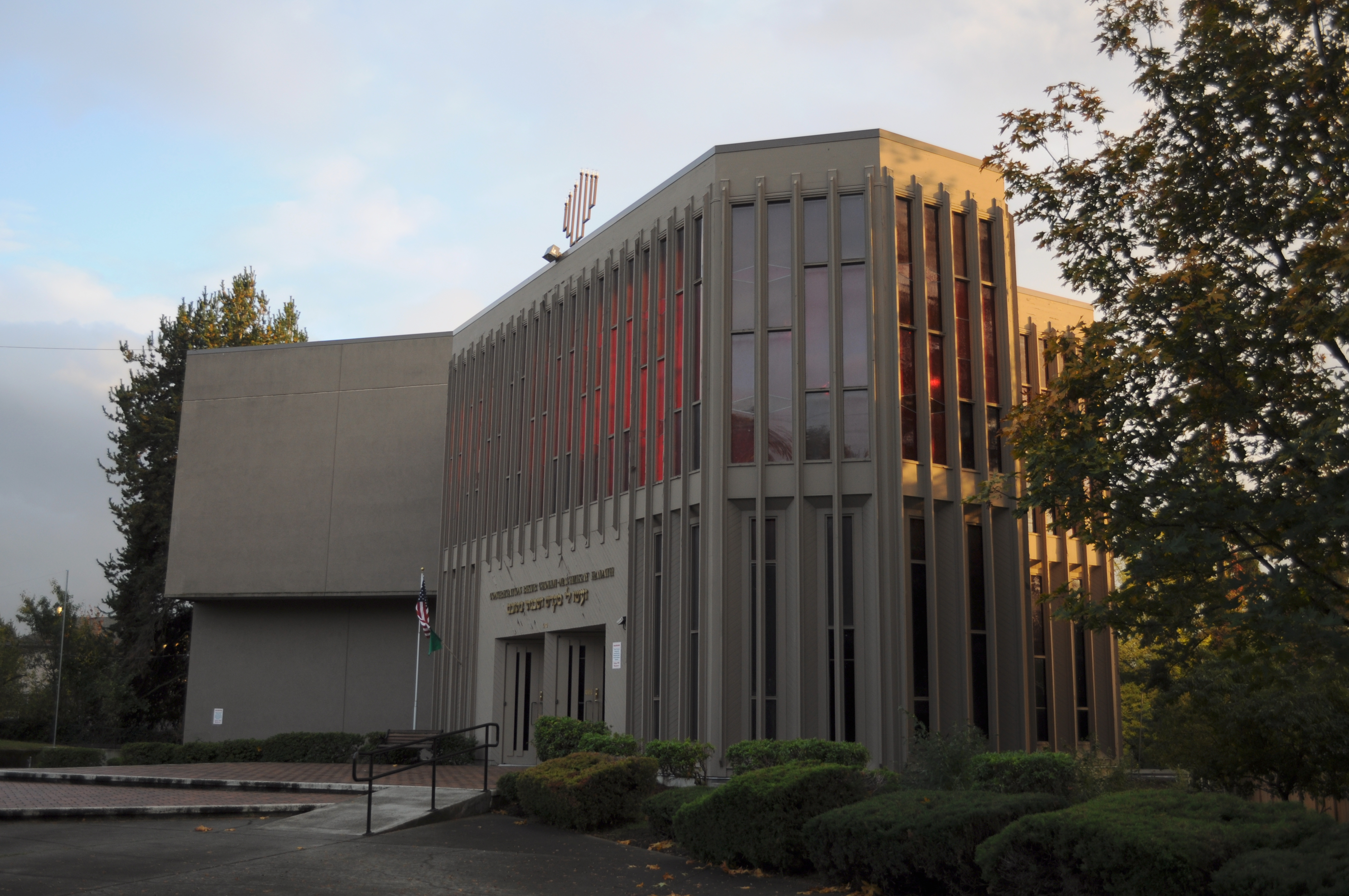
- The present synagogue, in 2009

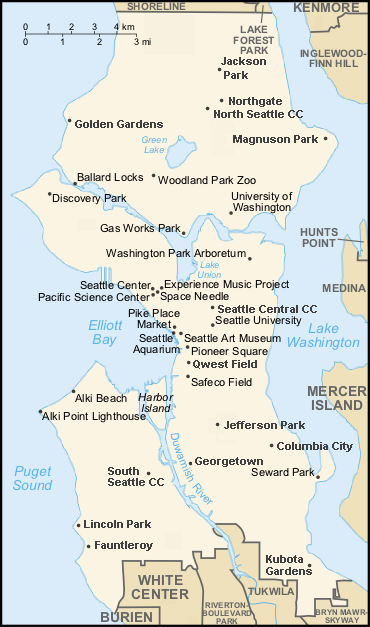
- Location in Seattle

Religion
- Affiliation: Orthodox Judaism
- Rite: Ashkenazi
- Ecclesiastical or organisational status: Synagogue
- Leadership: Rabbi Yaakov Tanenbaum
- Status: Active

Location
- Location: 5145 South Morgan Street, Seward Park, Seattle, Washington 98118
- Coordinates: 47°32′37″N 122°16′00″W

Architecture
- Established: 1891 (as a congregation)
- Completed: 1914 (104 17th Avenue S); c. 1960s (Seward Park); 1972 (current site)

Website
- bcmhseattle.org

Bikur Cholim Machzikay Hadath, abbreviated as BCMH, is an Orthodox Jewish congregation and synagogue located at 5145 South Morgan Street, in the Seward Park neighborhood of Seattle, Washington, in the United States. Founded in 1891, it is the oldest synagogue in Washington state; and practises Ashkenazi traditions.

== History ==
The congregation was founded in 1891 as Chevra Bikur Cholim. Jewish communal religious activity associated with Bikur Cholim predates its formal incorporation. Simchat Torah services were held in 1889 at Red Man’s Hall in downtown Seattle, and the chevra’s early activities included visiting the sick and providing proper burial. Burial grounds were acquired at Oak Lake around 1890.

The congregation’s synagogue at 104 17th Avenue South was designed by architect B. Marcus Priteca and constructed between 1909 and 1915. The building was placed into use beginning in 1910 and was fully completed in 1915. It was sold to the City of Seattle in 1969. Since 1969, the former synagogue building has housed the Langston Hughes Performing Arts Institute.

Bikur Cholim moved to Seward Park in the early 1960s. In 1971, Congregation Bikur Cholim merged with Congregation Machzikay Hadath.

On January 22, 1972, the newly formed Congregation Bikur Cholim—Machzikay Hadath dedicated its newly constructed synagogue building in Seward Park. In an antisemitic incident in September 2009, the synagogue was defaced with Nazi graffiti.

In September 2009, the synagogue was vandalized with Nazi graffiti in an antisemitic incident.

In 2015, the congregation began construction of a new youth center as part of its campus.

Ben Bridge of Ben Bridge Jeweler's at one point was the President of Bikur Cholim Machzikay Hadath.

== Leadership ==
The rabbi of Bikur Cholim Machzikay Hadath has been Rabbi Yaakov Tanenbaum, since Fall 2016. Moshe Kletenik served as rabbi from 1994 until June 2013.

== Gallery ==
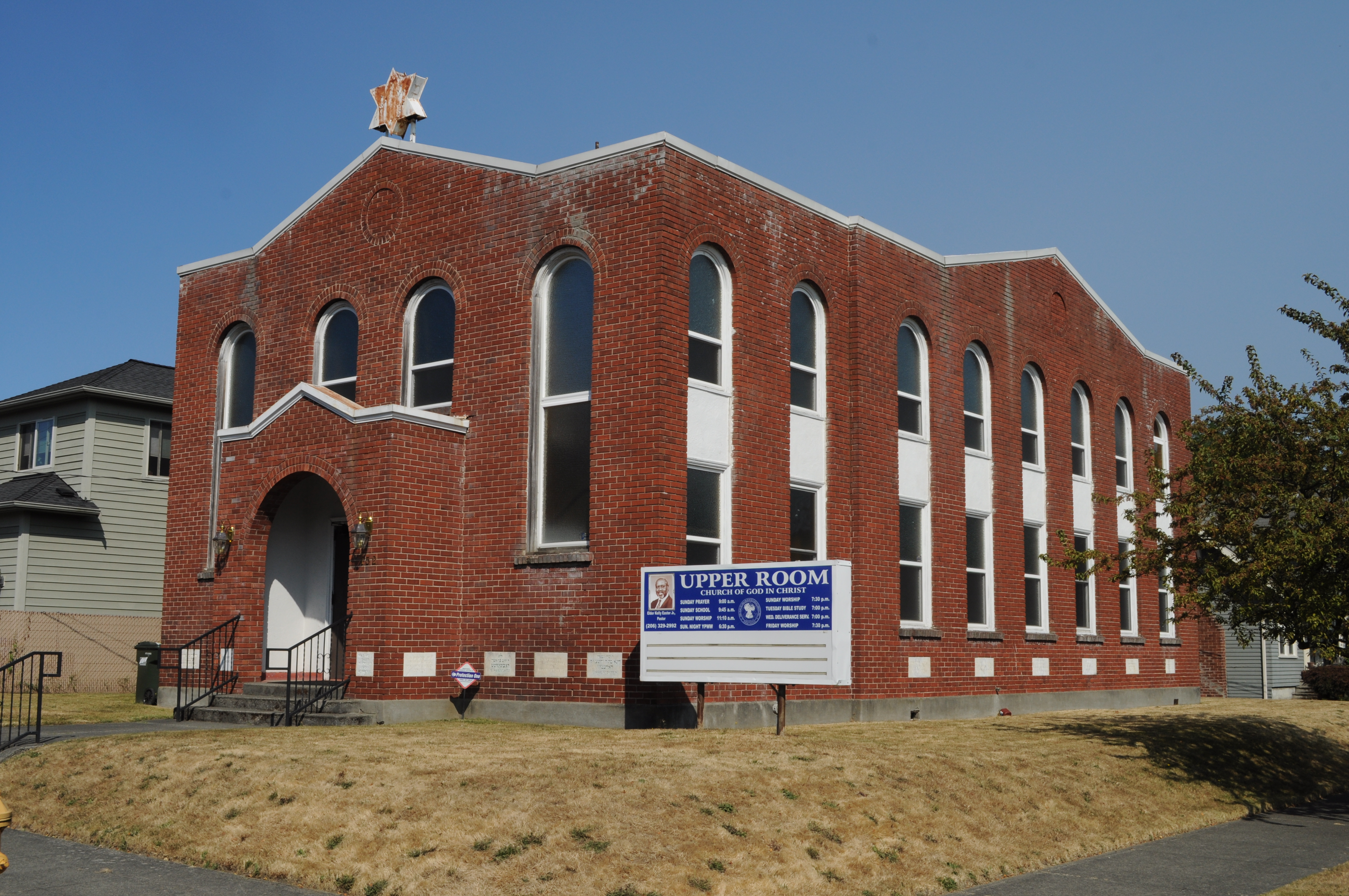
Former Machzikay Hadath synagogue at 152 26th Avenue, in 2011

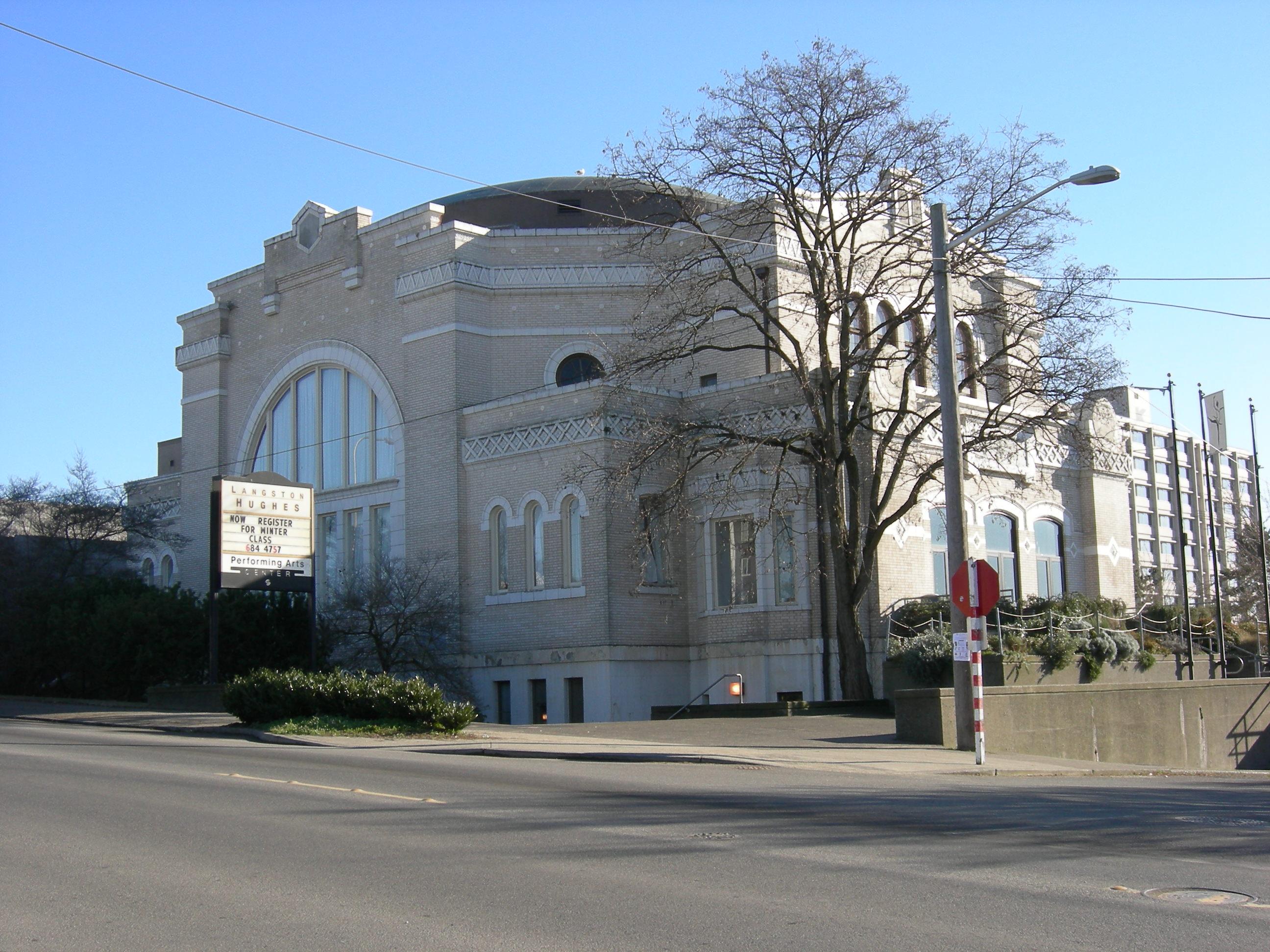
Former Bikur Cholim synagogue at 104 17th Avenue S., now the Langston Hughes Performing Arts Institute

== See also ==
- Bikur cholim
