= Beth Israel =

Beth Israel or Bet Israel (Hebrew: בית ישראל "House of Israel") may refer to:

== Synagogues ==
=== Canada ===
(by province then city)

- Beth Israel Synagogue (Edmonton), Albert
- Congregation Beth Israel (Vancouver), British Columbia
- Beth Israel Synagogue (Halifax, Nova Scotia)
- Beth Israel Congregation (Kingston, Ontario)
- Beth Israel Anshei Minsk (Toronto, Ontario)
- Congregation Beth Israel Ohev Sholem, Quebec City, Quebec
- Congregation House of Israel, Sainte-Agathe-des-Monts, Quebec
- Beth Israel Synagogue (Edenbridge, Saskatchewan)

=== United States ===
(by state then city)

- Congregation Beth Israel (Gadsden, Alabama)
- Temple Beth Israel (Phoenix), Arizona, listed on the National Register of Historic Places
- Congregation Beth Israel (Scottsdale, Arizona)
- Congregation Beth Israel (Berkeley, California)
- Temple Beth Israel (Fresno, California)
- Temple Beth Israel of Highland Park and Eagle Rock, Los Angeles, California
- Congregation Beth Israel (San Diego)
- Congregation Beth Israel-Judea, San Francisco, California
- Temple Beth Israel (Danielson, Connecticut), a former synagogue in Danielson, Connecticut
- Temple Beth Israel (Hartford, Connecticut)
- Beth Israel Synagogue (New Haven, Connecticut)
- Beth Israel Synagogue (Norwalk, Connecticut)
- Congregation Beth Israel (West Hartford, Connecticut)
- Temple Beth Israel (Macon, Georgia)
- Ahavath Beth Israel (Boise, Idaho)
- Congregation Beth Israel Abraham Voliner, Overland Park, Kansas
- Congregation Beth Israel (New Orleans)
- Congregation Beth Israel (Bangor, Maine)
- Beth Israel Congregation (Salisbury, Maryland)
- Beth Israel Synagogue (Cambridge, Massachusetts)
- Congregation Beth Israel (Malden, Massachusetts)
- Congregation Beth Israel (North Adams, Massachusetts)
- Congregation Beth Israel (Onset, Massachusetts)
- Congregation Beth Israel (Worcester, Massachusetts)
- Beth Israel Congregation (Ann Arbor, Michigan)
- Temple Beth Israel (Jackson, Michigan)
- Beth Israel Congregation (Jackson, Mississippi)
- Congregation Beth Israel (Meridian, Mississippi)
- Temple Beth Israel (Bergen County, New Jersey)
- Congregation Baith Israel Anshei Emes, Brooklyn, New York
- Congregation Beth Israel (Brooklyn), New York, a former synagogue
- Congregation Beth Israel West Side Jewish Center, Manhattan, New York
- Temple Beth Israel (Niagara Falls, New York), a former synagogue
- Temple Beth Israel (Plattsburgh, New York)
- Temple Beth Israel (Port Washington, New York)
- Temple of Israel Synagogue (Rockaway Beach, New York), a former synagogue
- Congregation Beth Israel (Asheville, North Carolina)
- Beth Israel Synagogue (Hamilton, Ohio)
- Temple Beth Israel (Eugene, Oregon)
- Congregation Beth Israel (Portland, Oregon)
- Temple Beth Israel (Altoona, Pennsylvania)
- Congregation Beth Israel (Honesdale, Pennsylvania)
- Congregation Beth Israel (Lebanon, Pennsylvania)
- Congregation Beth Israel (Media, Pennsylvania)
- Temple Beth Israel (Sharon, Pennsylvania)
- Beth Israel Congregation of Chester County, Upper Uwchlan, Pennsylvania
- Temple Beth Israel (York, Pennsylvania)
- Beth Israel Congregation (Washington, Pennsylvania)
- Beth Israel Congregation (Beaufort, South Carolina)
- Beth Israel Congregation (Florence, South Carolina)
- Old Beth Israel Synagogue (Greenville, South Carolina)
- Congregation Beth Israel (Austin, Texas)
- Congregation Beth Israel (Colleyville, Texas)
- Congregation Beth Israel (Houston), Texas
- Congregation Beth Israel (Charlottesville, Virginia)
- Beth Israel Synagogue (Roanoke, Virginia)
- Congregation Beth Israel (Bellingham, Washington)
- Congregation Beth Israel (Milwaukee)
- Temple Beth Israel (Stevens Point, Wisconsin), listed on the National Register of Historic Places

=== Elsewhere ===
- Bet Israel Synagogue (Belgrade)
- Beth Israel Synagogue (Oranjestad, Aruba)
- Bet Israel Synagogue (Istanbul)
- Bet Israel Synagogue (Izmir)
- Temple Beth Israel, Melbourne
- Temple Beth Israel, Montevideo, Uruguay

== Hospitals ==
- Beth Israel Deaconess Medical Center in Boston, Massachusetts, including the former Beth Israel Hospital
  - Beth Israel Deaconess Hospital – Plymouth, a location in Plymouth, Massachusetts (formerly Jordan Hospital)
  - Beth Israel Deaconess Hospital – Milton, a location in Milton, Massachusetts (formerly Milton Hospital)
- Mount Sinai Beth Israel, in Manhattan, New York, including the former Beth Israel Medical Center
- Newark Beth Israel Medical Center in Newark, New Jersey

== Cemeteries ==
- Beth Israel Cemetery (Meridian, Mississippi)

== Schools ==
- Beth Israel School, Portland, Oregon, listed on the National Register of Historic Places

== See also ==
- Beth (disambiguation)
- Beth Israel Hospital (disambiguation)
- House of Israel (disambiguation)
- Children of Israel (disambiguation)
- Israel (disambiguation)
- Israelite (disambiguation)
- Kingdom of Israel (disambiguation)
