= Mordecai Waxman =

Rabbi Mordecai Waxman

Mordecai Waxman, KCSG (February 25, 1917, in Albany – August 10, 2002, in Great Neck, New York), was a rabbi in the Conservative Jewish movement for nearly 60 years. He served as rabbi of Temple Israel in Great Neck, New York for 55 years from 1947 through his death in 2002. He is most notable for his interactions with Pope John Paul II in the 1980s as chairman of the International Jewish Committee for Interreligious Consultations.

Waxman was the author of Tradition and Change: The Development of Conservative Judaism, published in 1958. He also served as editor of the journal, Conservative Judaism for five years, from 1969 to 1974.

Waxman received his bachelor's degree at the University of Chicago and was ordained at the Jewish Theological Seminary of America in New York City. He was an Army chaplain during World War II, serving in Fort Dix, New Jersey and served from 1941 to 1942 as rabbi of Temple Beth Israel (Niagara Falls, New York), and also in Chicago, Illinois.

== 1987 Papal Address ==
The following is an excerpt from Waxman's speech addressing Pope John Paul II, which was delivered in September 1987:

"Catholics and Jews have begun the long overdue process of reconciliation. We still have some way to go because Catholic-Jewish relations is one of this century's most positive developments.

We remain concerned with the persistence of anti-Semitism - the hatred of Jews and Judaism, which is on the rise in some parts of the world. We are encouraged by your vigorous leadership in denouncing all forms of anti-Semitism, and by the church's recent teachings. The church's repudiation of anti-Semitism is of critical importance in the struggle to eradicate this virulent plague from the entire human family.

Anti-Semitism may affect the body of the Jew, but history has tragically shown that it assaults the soul of the Christian world and all others who succumb to this ancient, but persistent pathology.

We hope that your strong condemnations of anti-Semitism will continue to be implemented in the schools, the parishes, teaching materials and the liturgy, and reflected in the attitudes and behavior of Catholics throughout the world. Greater attention needs to be paid to the Christian roots of anti-Semitism.

The teaching of contempt reaped a demonic harvest during the Shoah in which one-third of the Jewish people were murdered as a central component of a nation's policy. The Nazi Holocaust-Shoah brought together two very different forms of evil: On the one hand it represented the triumph of an ideology of nationalism and racism, the suppression of human conscience and the deification of the state - concepts that are profoundly anti-Christian as well as anti-Jewish. On the other hand the Shoah was the culmination of centuries of anti-Semitism in European culture for which Christian teachings bear a heavy responsibility."

== Personal ==
- Waxman's wife, Ruth, died in 1996. She taught literature at the University of Chicago, Adelphi University, Long Island University C.W. Post Campus, Stony Brook University and Queens College. She was editor of Judaism: A Quarterly Journal of Jewish Life and Thought, published by the American Jewish Congress.
- In 1998, Waxman was named a Knight Commander of the Order of St. Gregory the Great by Pope John Paul II. He was the first rabbi and the fifth Jew to receive the honor.
- Waxman died just weeks before he was scheduled to retire on September 1, 2002.
- In the 1960s, Rabbi Harold Kushner, the best-selling author of When Bad Things Happen to Good People, worked as an assistant under Rabbi Waxman at Temple Israel in Great Neck, New York.
- Waxman is survived by three children, Rabbi Jonathan Waxman, David Waxman, and Hillel Waxman, and 5 grandchildren, Ariya Waxman, Amir-Kia Waxman, Lailee Waxman, Jessye Waxman, and Avir Waxman
