= Paula Reimers =

American rabbi (1947–2023)

- Born: 1947
- Died: June 14, 2003 (aged 55–56)
- Education: Barnard College (A.B., 1969); Columbia University (M.A., 1971); Jewish Theological Seminary of America (M.A., ordination, 1990)

Paula Reimers (1947–2023) was an American Conservative rabbi. In 2008 she was the rabbi of Congregation Beth Israel (Lebanon, Pennsylvania). However by January 2017 she was no longer listed as that Congregation's rabbi. Reimers was one of the first women to be ordained by the Conservative movement’s Jewish Theological Seminary of America.

== Biography ==
Reimers was educated at Barnard College, (A.B., 1969) M.A., Columbia University, (M.A., 1971) and the Jewish Theological Seminary of America (M.A., ordination, 1990). Reimers converted from Christianity to Judaism in 1981.

Reimers was politically active in defense of Palestinian rights. In 2001, shortly after the 9/11 attacks, Reimers invited several Muslims to join members of Burbank Temple Emanu-El in Burbank, California in their sukkah. In order not to offend the Muslim guests, Israeli flags were removed from among the sukkah decorations, offending some of her congregants. The congregation voted not to renew her contract.

By July 2015, Reimers was on the Rabbinical Council of Jewish Voice for Peace. However as of June 2018, she was no longer listed on that Council.

Reimers, a feminist, opposed using both male and female pronouns in worship.

Reimers spoke out against the Christian missionizing of Ralph Drollinger the former NBA player who now heads Capitol Ministries whose goal is: "Making disciples for Jesus Christ in state legislatures." Reimers further elaborated that:

In my opinion, the 2007 Commonwealth Prayer Breakfast clearly showed state endorsement of one particular religion (Christianity) and one particular sect within that religion (evangelical Protestantism), and even one particular Christian evangelical organization, Capitol Ministries. Many specific indications would lead to this conclusion.

Rabbi Reimers died on June 14, 2023.

== Publications ==
- "Feminism, Judaism, and God the Mother" (Conservative Judaism, Fall 1993)
