= Temple Beth Israel (Plattsburgh, New York) =

Reform synagogue in Plattsburgh, New York, US

- Hebrew: בית ישראל
- Location in New York

Religion
- Affiliation: Reform Judaism
- Ecclesiastical or organisational status: Synagogue
- Leadership: Rabbi David Kominsky
- Status: Active
- Notable artwork by: Marc Chagall (painting); Ben Shahn (tapestry); Frank Eliscu (sculpture)

Location
- Location: 1 Bowman Street, Plattsburgh, Clinton County, New York
- Country: United States
- Coordinates: 44°41′06″N 73°28′24″W

Architecture
- Established: 1861 (as a congregation)
- Completed: 1866 (Oak Street); 1971 (Bowman Street)

Website
- plattsburghtbi.org

Temple Beth Israel (Hebrew: בית ישראל) is a Reform Jewish synagogue located at One Bowman Street in Plattsburgh, Clinton County, New York, in the United States. Established in 1861, it initially served Plattsburgh's Jewish population and itinerant Jewish tradesmen in the region. After worshiping in temporary locations, the congregation acquired its first permanent home on Oak Street in 1866. Beth Israel adopted Reform services in 1910, and joined the Union for Reform Judaism in 1913.

The current building at 1 Bowman Street was completed in 1971, and houses a number of notable works of art by Marc Chagall, Ben Shahn and Frank Eliscu. Eric Slaton served as rabbi from 1985 to 1988, and Carla Freedman from 1990 to 1997;Freedman was the first Canadian woman to become a rabbi, and the first woman ordained at Hebrew Union College to become a grandmother. Freedman was followed as rabbi by David Steinberg (1999–2005), Heidi Waldmann (2005-2008), Andrew Goodman (2008–2010), Emma Gottlieb (2010–2012), Kari Tuling (2012–2017), David Kominsky (2020-2022), and as of 2022 David Joslin is the synagogue's rabbi.

Temple Beth Israel is the only synagogue in New York State north of Glens Falls that has a full-time rabbi. As of 2022, Joslin was the synagogue's rabbi.

== Early history ==
Temple Beth Israel is a Reform synagogue currently located at One Bowman Street in Plattsburgh, New York. It was established in 1861, as "The Jewish Congregation of Plattsburgh", serving Plattsburgh's Jewish population and the itinerant Jewish tradesmen in the region. Plattsburgh's Jewish community was the oldest in the Adirondack Mountains, having been founded in the 1840s by Jewish peddlers from western Vermont and northern New York. These traveling salesmen would come into Plattsburgh for High Holy Days and occasional Sabbath services.

The congregation initially worshipped in temporary locations. They soon had a rabbi, and in 1862, they acquired a cemetery. In the ensuing decades, congregations in less well-established nearby Jewish communities, such as the one Burlington, Vermont, would send their dead to Beth Israel's cemetery to be buried. In 1866 the members acquired their first permanent location, the former First Universalist Church on Oak Street.

Plattsburgh's Jewish community grew after 1880 as a result of Jewish immigration from Eastern Europe. By 1907, Plattsburgh's Jewish population was around 125. The congregation, then still located on Oak Street, had 25 member families, and an annual income of $900 (today $31,000). Jacob Lubin served as both rabbi and cantor, and services were held on the Sabbath and the Jewish holidays. The congregational school met twice a week, and had twelve students and one teacher. The congregation adopted Reform services in 1910, and joined the Union of American Hebrew Congregations (now Union for Reform Judaism) in 1913.

== Move to Bowman Street ==
The current building at One Bowman Street was completed in 1971, and includes a sanctuary, school, social hall, and library. It houses a number of notable works of art, including Marc Chagall's tapestry "King David", Ben Shahn's silk tapestry "The Menorah", and the bronze sculpture "Remembering the Six Million" by Frank Eliscu, who also designed the Heisman Trophy. The building also houses a cut and painted butcher paper decoration by Jacob Hochfelder, who was Beth Israel's cantor and spiritual leader in the late 1880s and early 1890s. Designed for the east wall of the synagogue sanctuary, it is inscribed with the biblical verse fragment "I am ever mindful of the Lord's presence" (Psalms 16:8), and was created in 1887–1889.

Fred V. Davidow, a 1973 graduate of Hebrew Union College-Jewish Institute of Religion, was Beth Israel's rabbi in the mid-1970s. Yossi Liebowitz was rabbi in the early 1980s. During his tenure, he appeared on a Plattsburgh public-broadcast program called "The Religion Factor" with a Presbyterian minister and Catholic priest. He left Beth Israel in 1984.

Minneapolis-born Eric R. Slaton became rabbi in 1985. Ordained by Hebrew Union College that year, he had served as a student rabbi at Cincinnati's Congregation B'nai Tzedek before joining Temple Beth Israel upon ordination. While at Beth Israel, he was also chaplain of Clinton Correctional Facility and Plattsburgh Air Force Base. Slaton served as rabbi for three years, before becoming rabbi of Ohavay Zion Synagogue in Lexington, Kentucky.

Carla Freedman became the congregation's rabbi in 1990. A native of Winnipeg with a master's degree in educational psychology from the University of Manitoba, she was ordained at Hebrew Union College that year, the first Canadian woman to become a rabbi. She was also the first woman ordained at Hebrew Union College to become a grandmother. She served until 1997, moving to the Jewish Family Congregation of South Salem, New York.

== Events since 1999 ==
In 1999, David Steinberg became rabbi. A graduate of Harvard Law School, he had practised as a lawyer for four years before studying and being ordained as a rabbi at the Reconstructionist Rabbinical College. While at Beth Israel, he was active in interfaith activities, and served as the president of the Interfaith Council of Plattsburgh and Clinton County in 2004 and 2005. That year he left Beth Israel to marry Peter Blackmer of Vermont, and become the associate rabbi of the Ohavi Zedek Synagogue of Burlington, Vermont.

Heidi Waldmann, also ordained at the Reconstructionist Rabbinical College, served as rabbi from 2005 to 2008. Andrew Goodman joined as rabbi that year, his first pulpit. He left in June 2010, to pursue studies at Virginia Commonwealth University. He was succeeded by Emma Gottlieb, a May 2010 graduate of Hebrew Union College in New York City.

As with her predecessor, Beth Israel was Gottlieb's first pulpit, though she had previously done a two-year internship at a synagogue in Rye, New York. Her father, Daniel Gottlieb, was also a rabbi. Though the younger Rabbi Gottlieb was supposed to start at Beth Israel on July 1, she was delayed in taking up the role because she was a native of Toronto, Canada. Recent regulatory changes made the application process for foreign clergy to work in the United States lengthy, and she wasn't able to enter the country until mid-August. Gottlieb served as rabbi until 2012.

In July 2012, Kari Tuling became Beth Israel's spiritual leader. Ordained at Hebrew Union College in Cincinnati in 2004, Ohio she previously served congregations in Indiana and Ohio taught at the University of Cincinnati for five years.

Temple Beth Israel is the only synagogue in New York State north of Glens Falls that has a full-time rabbi. As of 2022, Joslin was the synagogue's rabbi.
