= House of Israel (disambiguation) =

House of Israel, or bet yisrael, traditionally refers to the ancient Israelites. It may also refer to:

- In Messianic Judaism, "the House of Israel" refers to the Ten Lost Tribes, as distinguished from the House of Judah, see Messianic Judaism#Two House theology
- House of Israel (Ghana), Jewish community in Ghana
- House of Israel (Guyana), a sect of Black Hebrew Israelites
- Literal translation of Beta Israel, or Ethiopian Jews
- Literal translation of Beit Yisrael, a neighborhood in Jerusalem
- Beth Israel (disambiguation), various synagogues and congregations
