= Beth Israel Congregation (Washington, Pennsylvania) =

Beth Israel
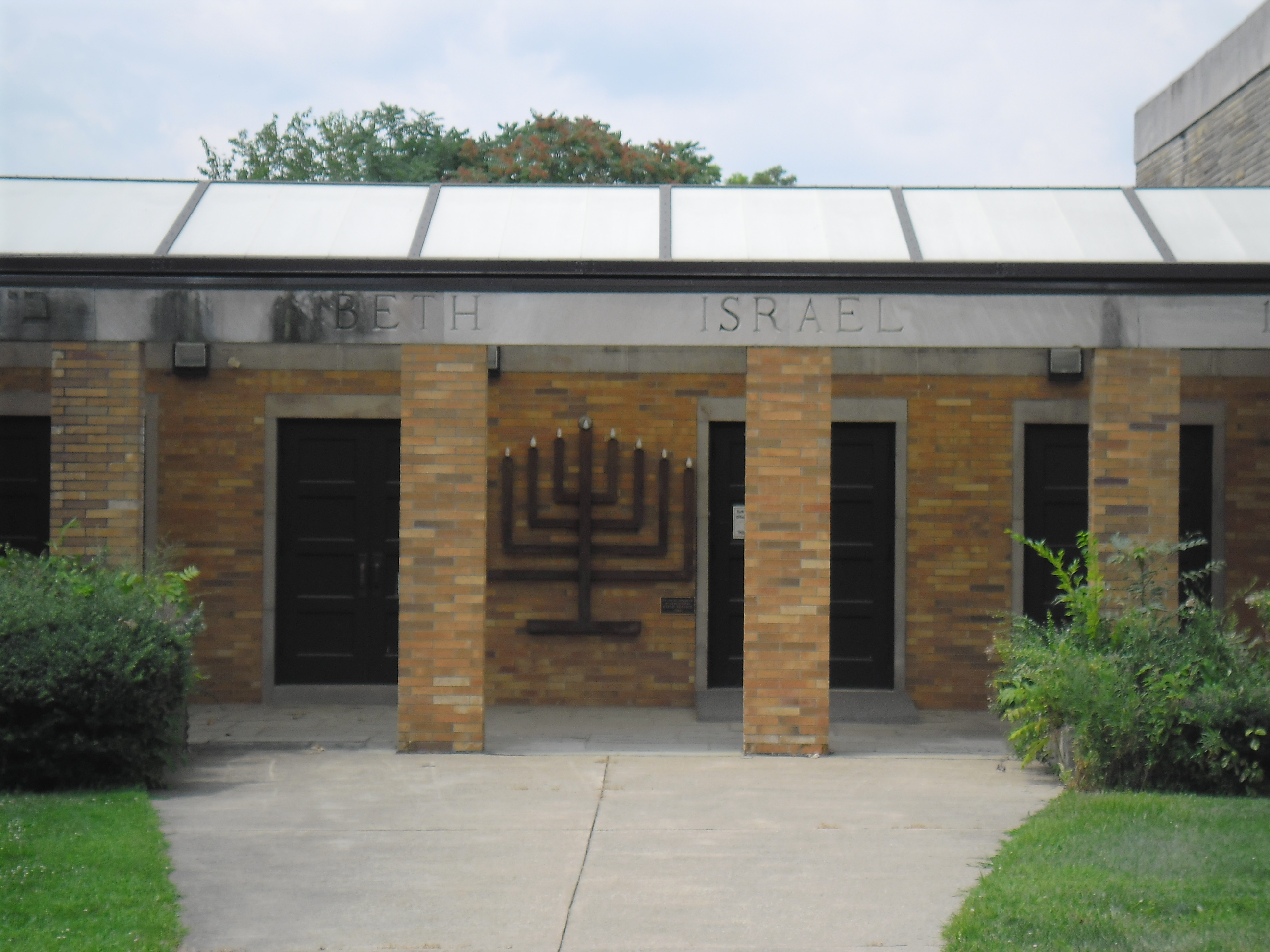
- The Beth Israel synagogue, in 2015

- Location in Pennsylvania

Religion
- Affiliation: Conservative Judaism
- Ecclesiastical or organisational status: Synagogue
- Leadership: Rabbi: vacant
- Status: Active

Location
- Location: 265 North Avenue, Washington, Pennsylvania
- Country: United States
- Coordinates: 40°10′40″N 80°14′10″W

Architecture
- Architect: Alexander Sharove
- Type: Synagogue
- Established: 1891 (as a congregation)
- Completed: 1902 (Franklin and Spruce Sts.); 1955 (North Ave)

Beth Israel Congregation is a Conservative synagogue located at 265 North Avenue in Washington, Pennsylvania, in the United States. Founded in 1891, it was the first Jewish congregation in Washington County. Its first rabbi, Jacob Goldfarb, served for 50 years.

The congregation constructed its first building in 1902. The current building, at 265 North Avenue, was dedicated in 1955. In 2021 it was reported that the congregation placed the synagogue for sale, due to the impact of the COVID-19 pandemic, declining membership, and increased maintenance costs. $1.6 million was the listed sale price. It was reported that David Novitsky had ceased as rabbi of the congregation. The congregation sold its building to the AMVETS in 2024, but maintained the right to hold services in a small chapel on the property, rent free, for 20 years.

== Early history ==
Jacob Goldfarb moved to Washington, Pennsylvania in around 1890. The following year, he led the organization of Beth Israel Congregation as an Orthodox synagogue, serving as both its rabbi and cantor. It was the first Jewish congregation in Washington County.

By the turn of the 20th century, the Beth Israel had 22 member families, and an annual revenues of $600 (today $23,000). It held services on Friday nights and Saturday mornings, and had round 20 children in its religious school. In 1902, the congregation constructed its first synagogue building, at the corner of Franklin and Spruce. By 1907, membership was 26 families, out of a total Washington Jewish population of around 200 individuals. Annual revenues were $3,000 (today $104,000), and the religious school, which held classes daily, had 25 students. Emmy Award-winning film and television producer and director Bud Yorkin was a member as a youth in the 1920s and 1930s.

Goldfarb retired in 1941, becoming rabbi emeritus. He was succeeded as rabbi the following year by Maxwell Berger, described by Isaac Landman as "son of the chief rabbi of Toronto, Canada". Berger had previously served from 1940 to 1942 as the first permanent full-time rabbi of Beth El Congregation in Beckley, West Virginia.

== Events since 1955 ==
The congregation's current building at 265 North Avenue was dedicated in 1955. Designed by Alexander Sharove, it housed "two sanctuaries, classrooms, library, social hall, parlor, gymnasium/auditorium, and two kosher kitchens".

David J. Matzner was rabbi in the 1970s. Born in Wiesbaden, Germany in 1914, he received his rabbinic training first at the Jewish Teachers' Seminary in Duerzburg, then (from 1936 to 1938) at Yeshivat Torat Chayim in Jerusalem, where he was ordained. He returned to Weisbaden, working as sales representative, and was interned in several Nazi concentration camps during the Holocaust. He emigrated to the United States in 1950, serving as rabbi of Mount Sinai Congregation in Wausau, Wisconsin and Sons of Jacob Congregation in Waterloo, Iowa before coming to Beth Israel. He retired in 1978, returning to Israel for two years, before settling in Pompano Beach, Florida, where he died in 1986. A eulogy written by a former Beth Israel member in the Observer-Reporter described him as having "unique aura of sweetness and power".

David C. Novitsky was rabbi in the 2000s. A graduate of Touro Law Center, he was ordained in 1983 by the Rabbi Isaac Elchanan Theological Seminary of Yeshiva University. In addition to serving as a rabbi, he practiced as a litigation attorney for over 14 years, and is an adjunct instructor in the Religious Studies department of Washington & Jefferson College.

As of 2012, Beth Israel was the only synagogue in Washington County; and its rabbi was David Novitsky. However, in 2021 it was reported that the congregation placed the synagogue for sale, due to the impact of the COVID-19 pandemic, declining membership, and increased maintenance costs. $1.6 million was the listed sale price. It was reported that David Novitsky had ceased as rabbi of the congregation. The congregation sold its building in 2024 to the AMVETS and contents of the building were auctioned off in May, 2024.

== See also ==
- Jewish history in Pennsylvania
