= Congregation Beth Israel (Media, Pennsylvania) =

Reconstructionist synagogue in Media, Pennsylvania, United States

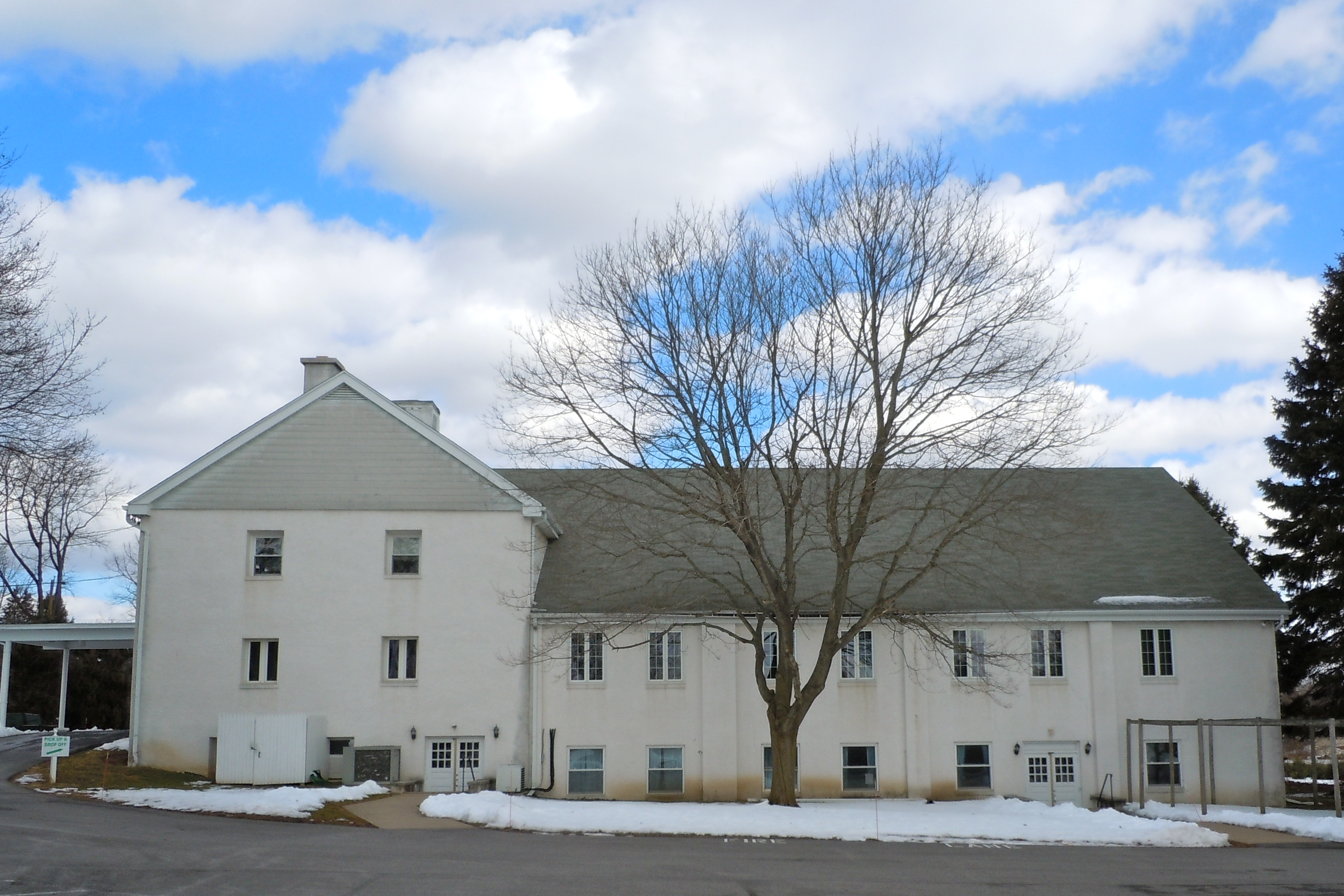
- Beth Israel synagogue

- Location in Pennsylvania

Religion
- Affiliation: Reconstructionist Judaism
- Ecclesiastical or organizational status: Synagogue
- Leadership: Rabbi Linda Potemken
- Status: Active

Location
- Location: 542 South New Middletown Road, Media, Pennsylvania
- Country: United States
- Interactive map of Congregation Beth Israel
- Coordinates: 39°53′20″N 75°24′14″W

Architecture
- Established: 1925 (as a congregation); 1935 (1st synagogue); 1997 (2nd synagogue)

Website
- bethisraelmedia.org

Congregation Beth Israel is a Reconstructionist synagogue located at 542 South New Middletown Road in Middletown Township in Delaware County, near Media, Pennsylvania, in the United States.

== History ==
Formed in 1925 and granted a charter by the Commonwealth of Pennsylvania in 1929, Beth Israel is the first Jewish congregation founded in Media, the second-oldest in Delaware County, and the oldest Reconstructionist congregation in the Philadelphia metropolitan area.

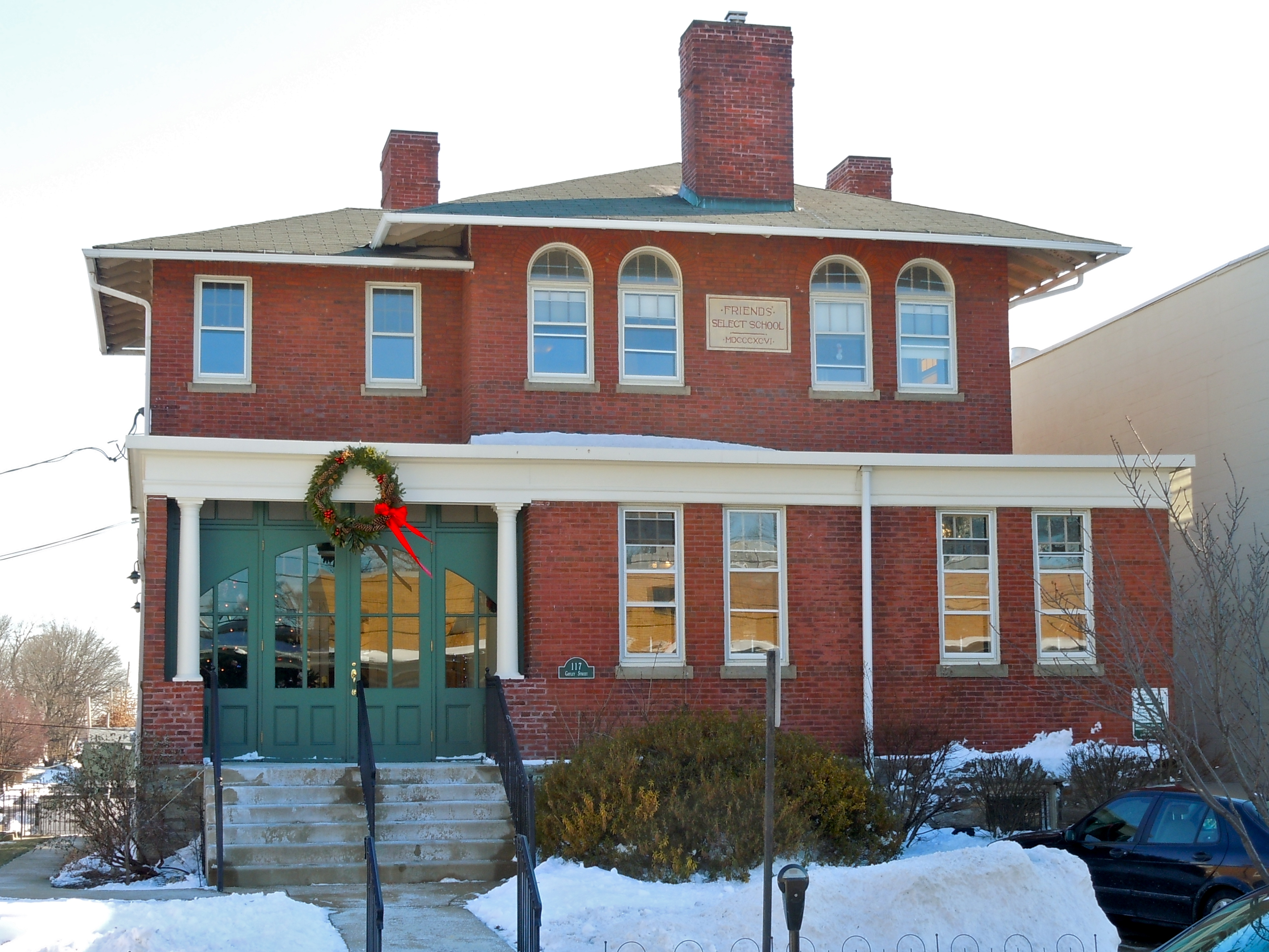
Gayley Street building

In 1935 the congregation bought the old Quaker school on Gayley Street in Media. Originally Orthodox and led by lay members, Beth Israel allowed mixed seating in the 1940s.

The congregation started hiring part-time rabbis from the Yeshiva University Synagogue Council in 1948, and in 1957 it hired its first full-time rabbi, a Yeshiva University graduate. Jewish families became attracted to local Conservative synagogues in the 1960s, and demographic changes and a deteriorating building led to a significant membership decline, with the synagogue almost failing. In 1972, Beth Israel affiliated with the Reconstructionist movement, and by the 1980s it had hired its first full-time Reconstructionist rabbi, and had outgrown its building. It moved into its current building on Middletown Road in 1997.

As of 2009, the rabbi was Linda Potemken.
