= Congregation Beth Israel (Lebanon, Pennsylvania) =

Synagogue in Lebanon, Pennsylvania, US

- Hebrew: בית ישראל
- Location in Pennsylvania

Religion
- Affiliation: Judaism
- Rite: Unaffiliated
- Ecclesiastical or organizational status: Synagogue
- Leadership: Rabbi Samuel W. Yolen
- Status: Active

Location
- Location: 411 South Eighth Street, Lebanon, Pennsylvania
- Country: United States
- Interactive map of Congregation Beth Israel
- Coordinates: 40°20′00″N 76°25′26″W

Architecture
- Architect: Percival Goodman
- Type: Synagogue architecture
- Established: 1907 (as a congregation)
- Completed: 1953
- Capacity: 200 worshipers

Website
- congregation-beth-israel.com

Congregation Beth Israel (Hebrew: בית ישראל) is a Jewish congregation and synagogue located at 411 South Eighth Street, in Lebanon, Pennsylvania, United States. Founded in 1907 to provide services for the High Holidays, it was then, and remains today, the only synagogue in the Lebanon area.

The congregation's current building, designed by Percival Goodman to mirror the barns of the surrounding Pennsylvania Dutch community, was dedicated in 1953.

Rabbi Samuel W. Yolen, a graduate of The Academy of Jewish Religion in New York, is the current spiritual leader.

== Early history ==
Beth Israel was formed in 1907 as a Conservative congregation by Jews in Lebanon, Pennsylvania who wanted a place to worship on the High Holidays. Services were, for a number of years, held in various homes.

In 1915, when the membership reached 25, the congregation purchased a house on the southeast corner of Cumberland and Old Cumberland Streets. Beth Israel moved to the third floor of the Samler Building at Eight and Cumberland Streets in 1918, where they remained for over a decade. At the time of the move, the "rabbi-cantor" was Alter B. Freedman, the synagogue had 35 member families, and its annual income was $1,500 (today $32,000). The religious school held classes five days a week, and had 25 pupils. By 1929 membership had reached 90, and Beth Israel purchased the empty Emanuel Evangelical Church at 624 Chestnut Street.

The congregation moved to its current location, at 4111 South Eighth Street, in 1953. The building, designed by synagogue architect Percival Goodman, was intended to mirror the surrounding community; as Lebanon was a region heavily populated by Pennsylvania Dutch farmers, he designed the synagogue as "a barn-style white building with Hebrew lettering on the facade."

== 1970 to 2006 ==
Steven M. Glazer joined the synagogue as rabbi in 1970, upon his graduation from the Jewish Theological Seminary of America. He served until 1977, when he moved to Temple Beth-El of Birmingham, Alabama. At the time Beth Israel had 120 member families.

Louis Zivic joined as the congregation's rabbi and principal of the religious school in 1983. Psychologist Julie Allender, his former wife (they divorced in 1998), described the constraints involved in being a rabbi's wife in a Summer 1983 article in the Women's League of Conservative Judaism's Outlook magazine, and was cited in subsequent studies of rabbi's wives by Shuly Rubin Schwartz.

Zivic was a signator of an official protest letter in 2001 to President George W. Bush regarding Faith-Based Initiatives. In December of that year Dr Allender also argued that the annual Holiday Concert at the local Cedar Crest high school was "too Christian in emphasis"; in response, "school officials decided to no longer ask visitors to stand while the chorus sings the 'Hallelujah Chorus' from 'Handel's 'Messiah'." The Catholic League included the incident in its 2001 Report on Anti-Catholicism.

In 2001, Beth Israel was also the recipient of the Solomon Schechter Gold Award for libraries.

Zivic served until 2004. He was followed as rabbi by Jonathan Panitz, who served during 2005 and 2006. Panitz had previously retired as chaplain for the National Naval Medical Center in Bethesda, Maryland.

== Recent events ==
Panitz was succeeded by Paula Reimers. Reimers had converted from Christianity to Conservative Judaism in 1981, became one of the Jewish Theological Seminary's earliest female graduates in 1990, and subsequently served as rabbi for 13 years at congregations in Los Angeles, Connecticut and Arizona before coming to Beth Israel. In Los Angeles she was the rabbi of Burbank Temple Emanu-El in Burbank, California for seven years, but in 2001, shortly after the September 11 attacks, she became embroiled in controversy there. She had invited several Muslims to join temple members in the temple's sukkah, and in order not to offend the guests, had Israeli flags removed from among the sukkah decorations, which in turn offended some of her congregants. Though neither she nor the synagogue's board attributed it to this incident, it, along with her "extremely dovish politics", contributed to her contract not being renewed.

While serving as rabbi of Beth Israel, Reimers also served as the Jewish chaplain at Lebanon Valley College, and ran an interfaith dialogue program at the synagogue. In 2007 she protested the Commonwealth Prayer Breakfast held in Harrisburg, Pennsylvania, which, in her opinion, "clearly showed state endorsement of one particular religion (Christianity) and one particular sect within that religion (evangelical Protestantism), and even one particular Christian evangelical organization, Capitol Ministries."

Until 2008, Congregation Beth Israel was affiliated with the United Synagogue of Conservative Judaism; that year it chose to resign from the organization. As of 2010, it was the only synagogue in the Lebanon area. The rabbi was Paula Reimers and the president was Judith Clark.

== See also ==
- Jewish history in Pennsylvania
