= Temple Beth Israel (Stevens Point, Wisconsin) =

- U.S. National Register of Historic Places
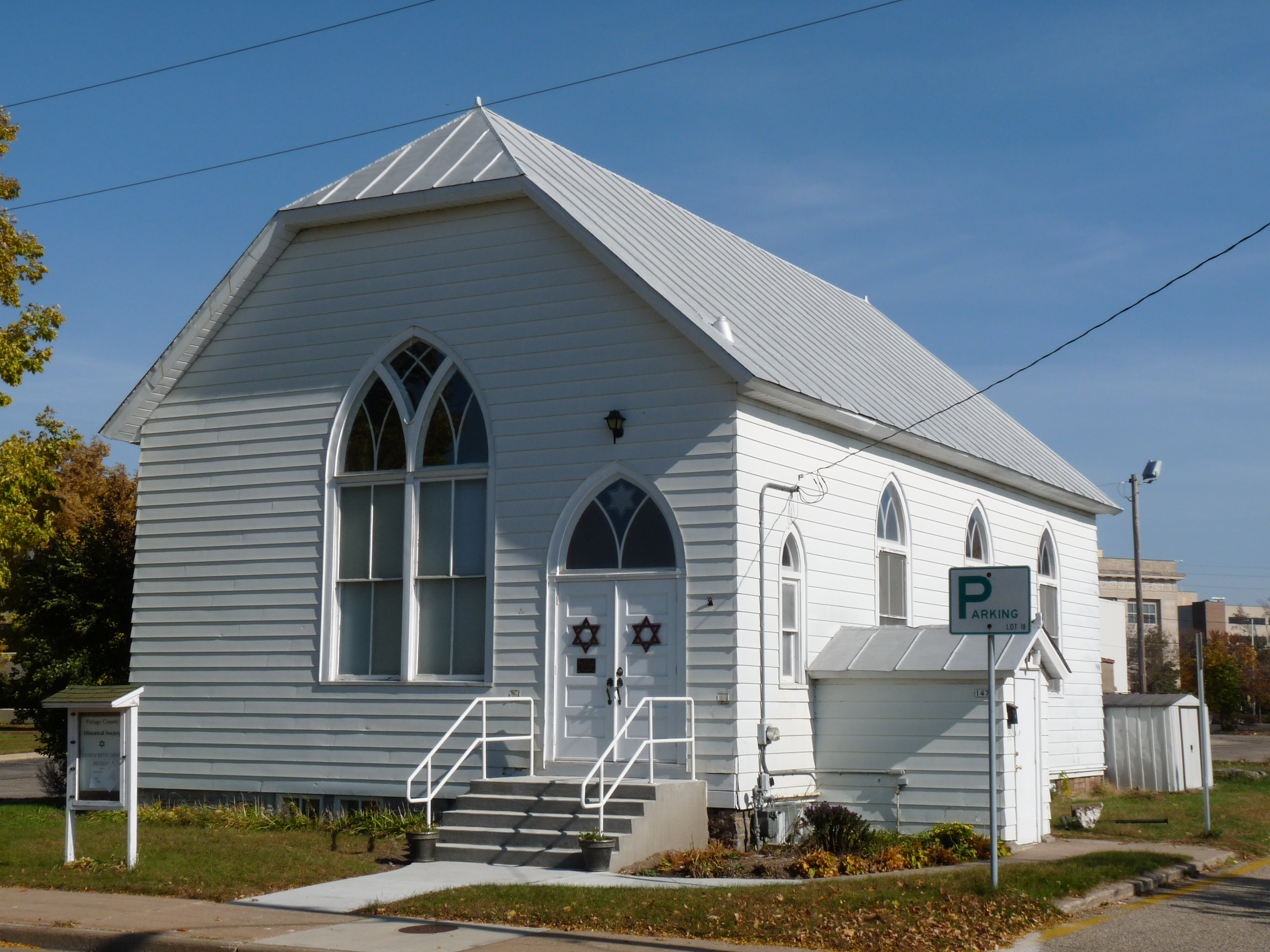
- Temple Beth Israel
- Location: 1475 Water St. Stevens Point, Wisconsin
- Coordinates: 44.52042°N 89.58344°W
- Built: 1905
- Architect: John Bukolt
- NRHP reference No.: 07000101
- Added to NRHP: March 1, 2007

Temple Beth Israel is located in Stevens Point, Wisconsin. It was added to the National Register of Historic Places in 2007.

The building is now a museum known as the Beth Israel Synagogue and is operated by the Portage County Historical Society. Displays include Jewish religious practices and the history of the Stevens Point Jewish community.

== History ==
The structure is the third oldest synagogue in Wisconsin. It underwent remodeling in 1951.
