= Temple Beth Israel (Niagara Falls, New York) =

Synagogue in Niagara Falls, New York

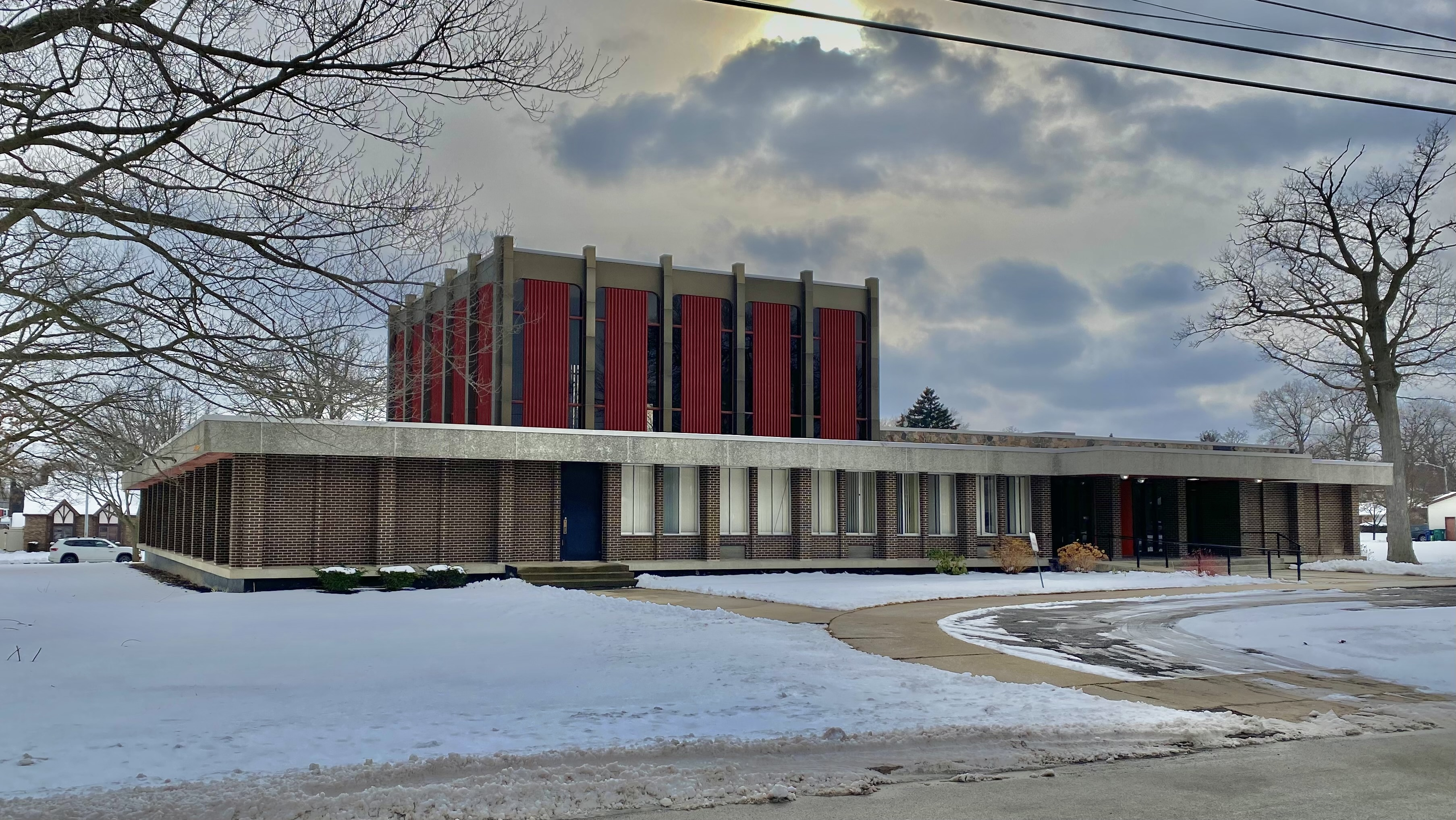
- The former synagogue as seen in January 2023

- Location of the former synagogue in New York

Religion
- Affiliation: Orthodox Judaism (1898–1931); Conservative Judaism (1931–2011)
- Ecclesiastical or organisational status: Synagogue (1898–2011)
- Status: Closed and inactive

Location
- Location: 905 College Avenue, Niagara Falls, New York
- Country: United States
- Coordinates: 43°07′20″N 79°03′11″W

Architecture
- Architects: Bazemore & Grove
- Type: Synagogue architecture
- Style: Modernist
- Established: 1898 (as a congregation)
- Groundbreaking: 1966
- Completed: 1967

Temple Beth Israel (Hebrew: בית ישראל) was a Jewish congregation and synagogue located at 905 College Avenue in Niagara Falls, New York, in the United States. Founded in 1898 and formally incorporated in 1905 as an Orthodox synagogue, it hired its first rabbi in 1916, and joined the Conservative movement in 1931.

The congregation moved to its most recent building in 1967, and soon afterwards membership peaked at over 180 families, but by 2008 had been reduced to 50. From 2005 to 2007 the synagogue was repeatedly targeted by vandals; after some of these incidents a federal investigation was started and two people were arrested, convicted, and sentenced.

Samuel Porrath served as rabbi from 1931 to 1934, and, though employed elsewhere, would subsequently often serve as interim rabbi; he was appointed "rabbi emeritus" in 1968. Melvin Kieffer was the congregation's longest serving rabbi, from 1947 to 1957. Haim Cassorla, Beth Israel's last rabbi, served from 1988 to 1995. In May 2011 the congregation stated it would disband by the end of the year.

== Early history ==
Founded in Niagara Falls in 1898, Temple Beth Israel formally incorporated in 1905, when it was granted a charter by the State of New York, and purchased land for $1,600 ($57,000 today) on Cedar Avenue. Construction of a building did not start until 1911, when the cornerstone was laid. At the time the congregation had 33 members. The building was completed in 1912 at a cost of approximately $12,000 ($400,000 today) of which half was borrowed as a mortgage. Jacob Schiff, the New York City philanthropist, donated $250 towards the costs. Annual dues averaged around $17 ($600 today).

In its early years Beth Israel could not afford a rabbi, Sunday School, or Hebrew school; High Holiday services were run by guest rabbis, and the rabbi of Niagara Falls' Temple Beth El would help out. In 1915 Beth Israel started providing Hebrew school classes, and in 1916 hired its first full-time rabbi, Moses Abramson, who served until 1918. Subsequent rabbis were Abraham Helfman (1919–1922), Israel Holtzman (1923–1924), and Alter Abelson (1925–1926).

During Abelson's final year at Beth Israel the congregation opened a permanently organized Sunday School; prior to that classes had not been "on a steady or permanently organized basis". Abelson was followed by Jacob Landy (1927–1928) and Isser Muskat (1928–1930).

== 1930s to 1950s ==
Though the synagogue had always called itself Orthodox, it also had liberal leanings, and in 1931 it affiliated itself with the United Synagogue of America (now United Synagogue of Conservative Judaism). That year Beth Israel hired Samuel I. Porrath as rabbi, a position he would hold until 1935. Porrath subsequently moved away from Niagara Falls, but would eventually return. Though employed elsewhere (including Temple Beth El in Buffalo, New York, and Niagara University, where he chaired the Institute of Transportation, Travel and Tourism), he would often serve as Beth Israel's interim rabbi when the congregation was between permanent rabbis. A founder of Niagara County Community College, Porrath was appointed Beth Israel's "Rabbi Emeritus" in 1968, and died in 1989.

After Porrath, Beth Israel went through another series of short-tenured rabbis: Jacob Friedman (1936–1937), Herman Glatt (1938–1940), and Mordecai Waxman (1941–1942). Waxman would subsequently serve as an Army chaplain in World War II, go on to become a prominent rabbi in the Conservative movement, and serve as rabbi of Temple Israel of Great Neck, New York from 1947 to his death in 2002. Waxman was followed by Simon Shoop (1942–1943), Philip Miller (1943–1944), and Jay Kaufman (1945–1946).

The congregation began work on an addition to the synagogue in 1947, which it completed in 1948. The total cost was $30,000, of which $20,000 was raised, and $10,000 borrowed.

In 1947 Beth Israel also hired Melvin Kieffer; he served until 1957, the synagogue's longest serving rabbi, and during his tenure, in 1955, Beth Israel's mortgage was finally paid off. Kieffer was followed by Seymour Schorr, who was hired in 1958.

== New building ==
By 1965 the congregation had approximately 175 families, and had outgrown its building on Cedar Avenue, which had inadequate facilities, and too few (and unsafe) classrooms. In 1961 Beth Israel had acquired from the New York Power Authority 2 acres (8,100 m^{2}) of land at College Avenue and Madison Avenue, valued at approximately $100,000, in exchange for 1-acre (4,000 m^{2}) of land the Authority needed in Beth Israel's cemetery. Funds were raised for a new building, and in 1966 construction began on facilities on College Avenue. The work was completed in time for High Holiday services to be held there in 1967.

That year Schorr asked to be released from his contract, and was replaced by Morris A. Cohen for 6 months, and then Samuel Porrath, who came out of retirement to assist. In 1968 Yosel I. Dick was hired as rabbi; he would serve until 1971. Membership peaked at over 180 families soon after the move to the new building.

== Decline ==
During the 1970s Niagara Falls had entered a long economic downturn: plants run by major employers closed, and the city's population dropped by over 40 percent. Jewish employees were laid off when the plants closed, and many Jewish businesses moved or went out of business. Jewish families left the area, and synagogue membership declined. During this period Israel Zimmerman was rabbi from 1972 to 1975, and Lawrence Pinsker, a graduate of the Reconstructionist Rabbinical College, from 1976 to 1980.

Jerome Kestenbaum joined as rabbi in 1981, and, feeling that the mortgage was a drain on the congregation, in 1982 he and synagogue president Samuel Wineburgh asked Jack A. Gellman to head a campaign to retire it. The original mortgage for the new building had been $350,000, and by 1982 the balance remaining was $42,000. The campaign was a success, and a mortgage burning dinner was held in October of that year.

Kestenbaum was replaced by Bruce Adler in 1983; Adler had just been ordained at the Reconstructionist Rabbinical College. He served for two years, moving to Beth Israel Synagogue of Hamilton, Ohio. In 1985 Kestenbaum returned, serving until 1986, when he was replaced by David Harary.

Haim Cassorla replaced Harary in 1988; when he left, in 1995, the congregation could not afford to hire a replacement. Dr. Laurence Boxer acted in place of a rabbi, without remuneration, conducting all services and grave-side rituals. By 1998 Beth Israel's membership had dropped to 65 families, and by 2008 membership was 50 families. In the 2000s, Beth Israel's president was Dr. Lawrence Wolfgang.

From 1978 on the temple held an annual fundraising dinner which, by 2011, typically raised $10,000. In May of that year the congregation stated it would donate all proceeds of the 2011 fundraising dinner to the Catholic Mount Saint Mary's Hospital in Lewiston, and disband by the end of the year. The members bestowed the annual fundraising event on the hospital's foundation.

== Targeted by vandals ==
In 1992 swastikas and the words "white power" were found on the synagogue's door, which was urinated on, and in 1997 vandals started a fire outside the building. However, a more sustained set of attacks started in 2005 and escalated in the summer and fall of 2006. Incidents occurred on a near-daily basis, and included urinating on the synagogue's doors and carving swastikas into them: a "skateboard club" named "DNA" had apparently claimed the Temple's property as its own "turf", and refused to leave. A federal investigation involving a Joint Terrorism Task Force agent and local police was begun when the message "Kill the Jews" was duct-taped to the building's door on January 12, 2007. The investigation was hampered because witnesses were afraid to speak, in fear of retaliation.

In February 2007 two people, one a juvenile, were arrested and charged in connection with the incidents. The suspects initially pleaded not guilty, but in early June were offered a plea bargain, and later that month Shawn M. Blount pleaded guilty to the vandalism. In August he was sentenced to one to three years in prison, and a co-defendant, who also pleaded guilty, was sentenced as a youthful offender to one year in the Niagara County Jail. At the synagogue's annual "Friends of Temple Beth Israel" dinner it honored that year the police officers and attorneys who prosecuted the perpetrators, and honored the following year the parish council president of St. Teresa Catholic Church and the founders of the Niagara Falls Human Rights Commission for helping raise awareness of the crimes.
