= Frank Eliscu =

American sculptor (1912–1996)

- Born: July 13, 1912; Washington Heights, Manhattan, New York City, U.S.
- Died: June 19, 1996 (aged 83); Sarasota, Florida, U.S.
- Education: Pratt Institute, New York Teacher's College
- Known for: Heisman Memorial Football Trophy; Library of Congress frieze Steuben Glass engravings
- Style: Realism
- Spouse: Mildred Norman
- Children: Norma Eliscu Banas
- Parents: Charles Eliscu (father); Florence Kane (mother)
- Elected: National Academy of Design (Associate 1956, Academician 1967)

A Cascade of Books (1983), Frank Eliscu's five-story bronze relief at the main entrance of the James Madison Memorial Building of the Library of Congress in Washington, D.C.

Frank Eliscu (July 13, 1912 – June 19, 1996) was an American sculptor and art teacher who designed and created the Heisman Memorial Football Trophy in 1935 when he was only 23 years old. The first Heisman Trophy, a strong young bull of a football player cast in bronze, was presented to a college football player in 1935, and is considered one of the greatest honors a college athlete can receive. Over the years the Heisman Committee has paid tribute to Eliscu and his creation several times, and in 1985, the Heisman Committee invited him to speak at the 50th Anniversary Heisman ceremonies.

Eliscu amassed a body of work that spans from public fountains to ex-President Gerald Ford's inaugural medal (later given as a gift to Leonid Brezhnev when Ford visited Russia), to the five-story bronze frieze that decorates the glass panes above the doors to the Library of Congress. This massive sculpture won the Henry Hering Memorial Medal from the National Sculpture Society. Eliscu also is represented in the Metropolitan Museum of Art with his Sea Treasures.

A resident of New York and later Sarasota, Eliscu died in Sarasota, Florida on June 19, 1996 at the age of 83.

== Family ==
Frank Eliscu was born in Washington Heights, Manhattan. His parents were Charles Eliscu and Florence Kane who was of Jewish descent. He had a sister, Rita Rothman and two brothers, William Eliscu and Nelson Eliscu. He married Mildred Norman and had one daughter, Norma Eliscu Banas.

== Education ==
Eliscu graduated from Pratt Institute in 1931 and from New York Teacher's College in 1942. He was awarded a permanent teaching certificate in 1944. In 1941, Eliscu apprenticed with Rudolph Evans and worked with him on the sculpting of the statue of Thomas Jefferson for the Jefferson Memorial.

== Military service ==
Eliscu served in the army in World War II from 1942 to 1945. He was first put to work on camouflage and maps for the Allied invasion. In 1943, he developed a unique technique used by the US Army to rehabilitate facial disfigurements from war injuries. According to his discharge papers, "Made drawings in the operating room of surgical procedures, modeling of features for reconstructive surgery, and carving cartilage for grafting in plastic surgery, pigmentation of skin in plastic procedures. Had three assistants working under him. Served at Valley Forge General Hospital in Plastic Surgery Department." Following his service, the unique research Eliscu did on tattooing pigmentation to cover the discoloration from skin grafts and for people with port wine stains was used at the New York Hospital. Eliscu applied for a patent for the tool he developed to use intradermal injections of permanent pigments.

== Career ==
Teacher, School of Industrial Art, NYC (currently called the High School of Art and Design) 1945 to 1970. As a sculptor, Eliscu had his first one-man show in 1929 at age 17. From there, Eliscu went on to a career that brought him international fame.

He has two National Monuments to his credit, "Uncle Joe Cannon" at the Cannon House Office Building and "Falling Books", a four-story bronze at the James Madison Library of Congress. The four-story falling books on the face of the Library of Congress building in Washington, D.C., took Eliscu 10 years to complete and in 1985 won him top honors from the National Sculpture Society. The heroic bronze, along with Eliscu's plaque of Uncle Joe Cannon in the same city, has been declared a national monument, and by law can never be removed or changed in any way.

He is represented in Brookgreen Gardens; in the Metropolitan Museum with a medallion titled Sea Treasures, 1965; in the Smithsonian Museum Archives, coins titled, Lewis & Clark, 1966; and in National Academy of Fine Arts Museum, with a bronze, 1967.

Eliscu created medals for the Society of Medalists with such pieces as "Sea Treasures" as well as the first multi-part medal made in the United States titled "Inspiration" and official Inaugural Medal presented to President Ford as well as the official medal commemorating the inauguration of Nelson A. Rockefeller as Vice President

In 1988, Eliscu designed an award for the Caring Institute to give annually to the most caring people in America. In 1991, Eliscu presented Henri Landwirth (Give Kids the World) with the Caring Award. and subsequently began created sculptures and jewelry for Henry Landwirth and Give Kids the World program. In 1993, the Caring Institute commissioned Eliscu to make a special award to be given by then First Lady Rosalynn Carter to be called the Rosalynn Carter Caregiver Award.

Steuben Glass commissioned Eliscu to do the engraving design for many of their pieces, including "Carousel of the Seasons", "To a Giraffe", "Daniel" and "St. Francis". He was called "an imaginative realist"; Eliscu often draws on biblical and classical themes for his sculpture designs. Other works for Steuben include a "Noah's Ark" shown on the cover of the Review, and "Daniel in the Lion’s Den".

== Exhibits ==
Eliscu’s work has been exhibited in many places, starting with the Clay Club of New York in 1935. (The Clay Club later became known as the National Sculpture Society.) He repeatedly exhibited at the Architectural League of New York, Wellons Gallery, and the National Sculpture Society.

A highlight exhibit was in Mexico at the Mexican North American Institute of Cultural Relations. The Architectural League of New York was quoted as saying, "Frank Eliscu, one of our sculptural colleagues scored a resounding success for himself, the profession, and our country, with his collection of twenty bronzes sponsored by the United States Embassy ... The result not only boosted the United States’ reputation in cultural circles but prompted a nationwide tour of the exhibit south of the border."

He has permanent exhibits at Brookgreen Gardens since 1955, Jewel Headley Museum since 1962, Omar Bradley Freedom Shrine since 1977, Ringling Museum since 1982, Alan Shepard Mercury 7 Hall of Fame since 1991 and at Caring Institute Hall of Fame since 1992.

== Recognition ==
The National Sculpture Society awarded Eliscu the Mrs. Louise Bennett Prize in 1954 at the 21st Annual Exhibition.

In 1956, he was elected into the National Academy of Design as an Associate member, and became a full Academician in 1967.

He received the Henry Hering Medal in 1960 for his work at two buildings: 100 Church Street and 529 Fifth Avenue in NYC. The architect on the projects was Emery Roth & Son and the owner was Erwin S. Wolfson. This award is given for collaboration between architect, owner and sculptor in the distinguished use of sculpture covering these three categories.

He was president of the National Sculpture Society from 1967 to 1970. Member of Art Advisory Board for Society of Medalists

He again won the Henry Hering Medal in 1985 for his work with Walker Hancock, Robert Cronbach and Robert Weinman on the James Madison Memorial Library in Washington, DC. Alfred Easton Poor was the architect and the owner was the U.S. Government.

He received the Herbert Adams Memorial Gold Medal for service to American sculpture 1988.

== Publications ==
- "Sculpture Techniques in Clay, Wax, Slate", Chilton Press, 1959
- "Direct Wax Sculptures", Chilton Press, 1969
- "Slate & Soft Stone Sculptures", Pitman Publications, 1973
