= Beth Israel Congregation (Salisbury, Maryland) =

Conservative synagogue in Maryland, US

- Hebrew: בית ישראל
- Location in Maryland

Religion
- Affiliation: Conservative Judaism
- Ecclesiastical or organizational status: Synagogue
- Leadership: Lay–led
- Status: Active

Location
- Location: 600 Camden Avenue, Salisbury, Maryland 21801
- Country: United States
- Interactive map of Beth Israel Congregation
- Coordinates: 38°21′27″N 75°36′20″W

Architecture
- Established: 1925 (as a congregation)
- Completed: 1951

Website
- bethisraelsalisbury.com

Beth Israel Congregation (Hebrew: בית ישראל) is a Conservative Jewish congregation and synagogue, located at 600 Camden Avenue, in Salisbury, Maryland, in the United States.

== History ==
Founded in 1925, it was organized by I.L. Benjamin upon the death of his father, and originally called Kahelas Israel Congregation. At the time there were only nine Jewish families in Salisbury.

Beth Israel moved to its current building in 1951.

In 2006 the congregation was recognized by both the Wicomico County and Salisbury councils for eighty years of providing services and programs to "residents of the Lower Eastern Shore of Maryland, Delaware and Virginia".

== See also ==
- History of the Jews in Maryland
