= Congregation House of Israel =

Synagogue in Quebec, Canada

- French: Congrégation Maison d'Israël; Hebrew: ק״ק בֵּית יִשְׂרָאֵל
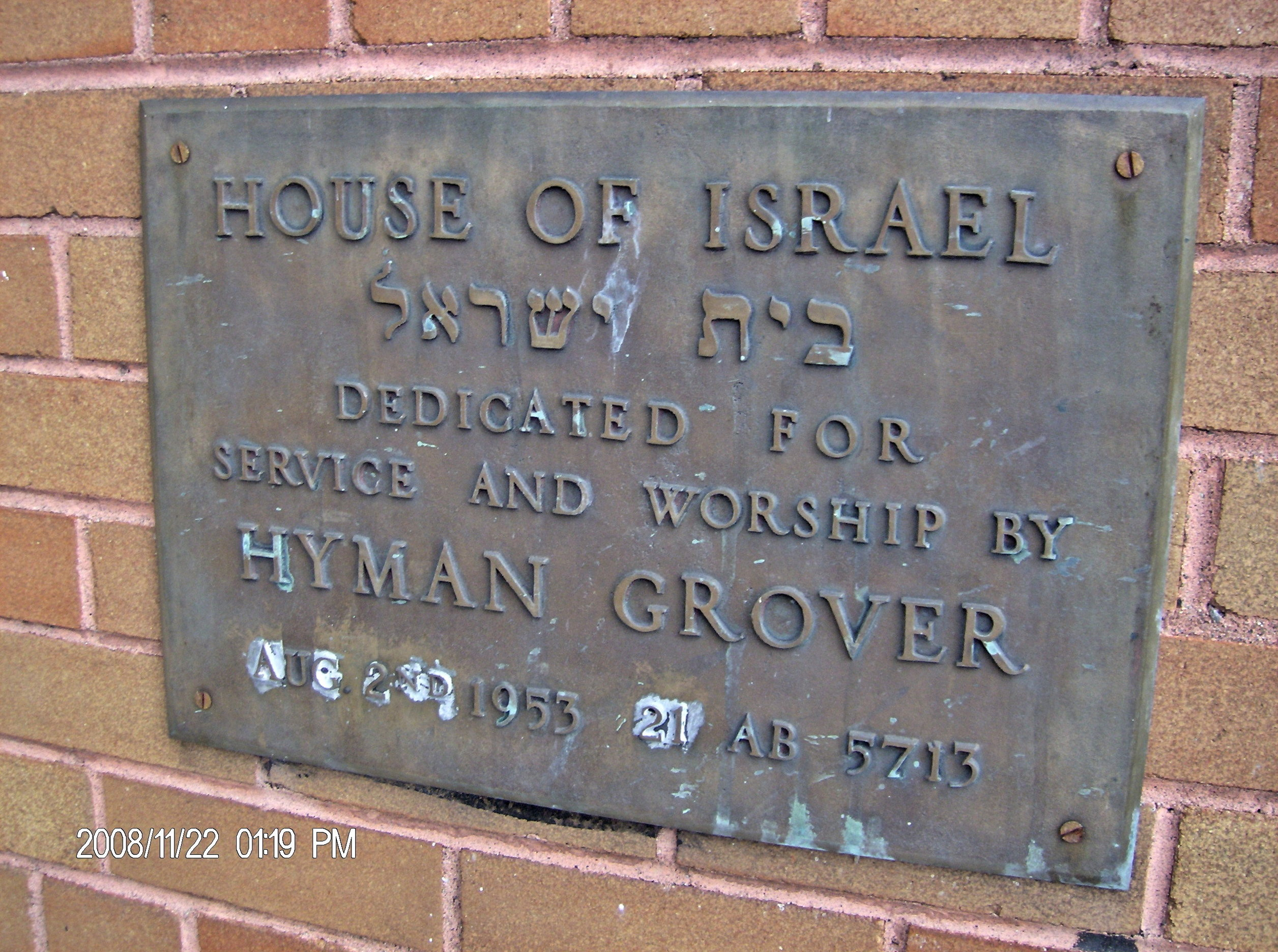
- Entrance plaque at the Congregation House of Israel

Religion
- Affiliation: Orthodox Judaism
- Sect: Laurentides
- Rite: Ashkenazi
- Ecclesiastical or organisational status: Synagogue
- Leadership: Rabbi Emanuel Carlebach
- Status: Active

Location
- Location: 27 St. Henri Street West, Sainte-Agathe-des-Monts, Quebec J8C 1C5
- Country: Canada
- Interactive map of Congregation House of Israel
- Coordinates: 46°3′4″N 74°17′25″W

Architecture
- Type: Synagogue
- Established: July 12, 1953; 73 years ago

Website
- houseofisrael.org

Congregation House of Israel (French: Congrégation Maison d'Israël, Hebrew: ק״ק בֵּית יִשְׂרָאֵל) is an Orthodox synagogue in Sainte-Agathe-des-Monts, Quebec, serving the Laurentian Jewish community. It was officially opened on 12 July 1953.

The congregation is led by Rabbi Emanuel Carlebach, who assumed the role upon the passing of his father Rabbi Ephraim Carlebach in 1985. The House of Israel counts more than 1,500 families as members, mostly Montrealers with second homes in the Laurentians. The congregation also hosts a religious school and early learning centre.
