= Beth Israel Synagogue (Hamilton, Ohio) =

- Hebrew: בית ישראל
- Location in Ohio

Religion
- Affiliation: Conservative Judaism
- Ecclesiastical or organizational status: Synagogue
- Leadership: Rabbi Eric R. Slaton
- Status: Active

Location
- Location: 50 North 6th Street, Hamilton, Ohio
- Country: United States
- Interactive map of Beth Israel Synagogue
- Administration: United Synagogue of Conservative Judaism
- Coordinates: 39°23′56″N 84°33′19″W

Architecture
- Established: 1901 (as a congregation)
- Completed: 1931
- Capacity: 200+

Website
- bethisraelcongregation.net

Beth Israel Synagogue (Hebrew: בית ישראל) is a Conservative synagogue located at 50 North 6th Street in Hamilton, Ohio, in the United States. It was founded in 1901 as an Orthodox alternative to Hamilton's existing Reform synagogue, and completed its current building in 1931. The congregation moved to the Conservative movement, and became egalitarian in the 1980s. Eric R. Slaton became rabbi in 1999.

== Early history ==
Beth Israel Synagogue (was organized by eight families in 1901 as an Orthodox alternative to Hamilton's existing synagogue, a Reform congregation on High Street that was founded in the 1880s. The founding members were Yiddish-speaking immigrants, more traditional than Hamilton's existing English speaking Jewish community of around 250 families. The new congregation initially worshiped in members' homes, and then a converted warehouse on Hamilton's East Side, at the corner of Fifth and Charles streets. In its early years was served by a series of temporary rabbis, who often also served as ritual slaughterers. It obtained a charter from the State of Ohio as Bais Israel in 1911.

By 1919, under the leadership of Rabbi J.H. Goodman, the congregation comprised 42 member families. Services were held in Hebrew, and the congregation's religious school had 45 students and held classes daily. The Ladies Auxiliary was formed in 1923, and purchased land at Sixth and Butler in 1929. The congregation sold its existing building, and began worshiping at a temporary location on Main Street. That year the rabbi was Gabriel Zacuto.

The current synagogue building at 50 North 6th Street was completed in 1931. It consisted of a main sanctuary, capable of seating over 200, a social hall and a kitchen. At the time the congregation had 60 member families. Visiting Zionist leaders used the new social hall to raise money for the creation of the State of Israel.

The Great Depression caused the congregation significant financial distress. Zacuto's salary was cut in half, to $25 (today $590) per week, and his contract was concelled. He left in 1933, and was replaced by Bernard Kalchman. The congregation opened a religious school in 1939.

== Post World War II ==
Kalchman left in 1946, and was succeeded the following year by Murray Garson. Garson initiated late Friday night services, but left the following year, and was replaced by Joseph Krickstein, who served until his retirement in the 1960s. He was followed by Rabbis Dworkin, Max Newman, Portnoy and Seth Phillips. Phillips was followed by Mark Warshofsky.

An addition to the synagogue building, started in 1960 and completed in 1961, included offices and classrooms. In 1964, a chapel/multi-purpose room was added. The synagogue eventually moved away from Orthodox Judaism, and joined the United Synagogue of Conservative Judaism.

In 1984 the congregation voted to count women in the minyan. That year Bruce Adler joined as rabbi; he had previously served for one year as rabbi of Temple Beth Israel of Niagara Falls, New York, following his ordination at the Reconstructionist Rabbinical College. In 1985, Beth Israel elected its first woman president and voted to call women to the Torah.

Adler left in 1997, and Eric R. Slaton joined as rabbi in 1999. He had previously served for eleven years as rabbi of Lexington, Kentucky's Ohavay Zion Synagogue.

In 2011, the congregation celebrated its 100th anniversary. Activities included extracting a time capsule filled with documents and artifacts buried in the cornerstone of the synagogue building, and replacing it with copies of the existing material and new artifacts.
