= Congregation Beth Israel Abraham Voliner =

Orthodox synagogue in Kansas City, Kansas, United States

Beth Israel Abraham Voliner
- Location in Kansas

Religion
- Affiliation: Orthodox Judaism
- Ecclesiastical or organisational status: Synagogue
- Leadership: Rabbi Ezra Cohen
- Status: Active

Location
- Location: 9900 Antioch Road, Overland Park, Kansas City Metropolitan Area, Kansas 66212
- Country: United States
- Coordinates: 38°56′58″N 94°41′12″W

Architecture
- Established: 1894 (as Tefereth Israel)
- Completed: 1905 (Admiral Boulevard); 1959 (83rd and Holmes); 1987 (Overland Park,); 1994 (Antioch Road)

Website
- biav.org

Congregation Beth Israel Abraham Voliner, abbreviated as BIAV, is an Orthodox Jewish congregation and synagogue, located 9900 Antioch Road, in Overland Park, in the Kansas City Metropolitan Area of Kansas, in the United States.

Formally established as Tefereth Israel in Kansas City, Missouri in 1894, by 1960 it had moved several times, and merged with three other congregations, taking on its current name. Responding to demographic shifts in Kansas City's Orthodox community, it opened a branch in Overland Park in 1987, and in 1994 it moved to its current location at 9900 Antioch Road.

Morey Schwartz was the congregation's rabbi from 1991 to 2000, Ari Perl served from 2000 through 2003, and David S. Fine served from 2003 through 2008. As of 2008 Beth Israel Abraham Voliner was the only Orthodox synagogue in Kansas City. As of 2010 it was the only Orthodox synagogue in the State of Kansas, and the rabbi was Daniel Rockoff. Rabbi Mark Glass has served as senior rabbi since August 2020.

== History ==
=== 19th and 20th centuries ===
Congregation Beth Israel Abraham Voliner (also Congregation Beth Israel Abraham & Voliner or Congregation Beth Israel Abraham and Voliner or BIAV) was established in Kansas City, Missouri as the Tefereth Israel (or Tiferes Israel) (Hebrew for "Splendor of Israel") Congregation in 1894. It grew out of a prayer group called Etz Chaim (Hebrew for "Tree of Life"), which began gathering for minyans (prayer quorums) in 1890. In 1905, it moved to a building at Admiral Boulevard and Tracy, and later merged with Beth Abraham and Beth Hamedrash Hagadol congregations. In 1918, the rabbi was S.M. Bayarksy. The congregation moved to a building at 83rd and Holmes in 1959, and in 1960 merged with Voliner Anshei Sefard, when it took on its current name.

As Kansas City's Orthodox community moved from Missouri to Kansas, Beth Israel Abraham Voliner followed. In 1987 it opened a branch in Overland Park, and in 1994 it moved to its current location there at 9900 Antioch Road, the former Overland Park Baptist Temple. The move attracted younger families, "and more Bar and Bat Mitzvahs were held in 1999 than in the entire previous decade."

Morey Schwartz served as the congregation's rabbi from 1991 until 2000, when he and his family moved to Israel. In the summer of 1997 he set up Kansas City's first kollel, a post-graduate institute for advanced studies of the Talmud and of rabbinic literature for Jewish men; it closed in 2005 due to a lack of funds.

=== 21st century ===
Schwartz was succeeded by Ari Perl, who served until 2003. Perl had received his semicha (rabbinic ordination) from Yeshiva University's Rabbi Isaac Elchanan Theological Seminary, and had previously served as Assistant Rabbi at Congregation Ahavath Torah in Englewood, New Jersey. While serving as rabbi of Beth Israel Abraham Voliner, Perl also served as a legal decisor for the kosher supervision body, eruv, ritual bath, and burial society.

David S. Fine served as rabbi from 2003 until mid-2008, when he moved to Israel. During this period he also served on the executive board of the Rabbinical Council of America, a member of the Chicago Rabbinical Council, and was Midwest Regional President of Amcha - The Coalition for Jewish Concerns.

Fine brought the Synaplex national synagogue revitalization program to Beth Israel Abraham Voliner in 2005; out of 100 congregations that initially adopted the program, only two, including Beth Israel Abraham Voliner, were Orthodox. In 2007 the synagogue won a $20,000 grant from the Orthodox Union to help the congregation's outreach programs aimed at "young families, singles, and other unaffiliated Jews". Beth Israel Abraham Voliner's proposal was "based on four prongs, or suppositions: the lack of Jewish knowledge among the unaffiliated; the loneliness of young mothers after childbirth; lack of time to become involved by busy professionals; and need for lay leadership training."

Daniel Rockoff became Beth Israel Abraham Voliner's rabbi in September 2008. A native of Newton, Massachusetts, and a graduate of Maimonides School, he received his rabbinic ordination from Yeshiva University's Rabbi Isaac Elchanan Theological Seminary. Prior to serving at Beth Israel Abraham Voliner, Rockoff was the assistant rabbi at Congregation Ahawas Achim B'nai Jacob and David in West Orange, New Jersey.

Mark Glass served as the congregation's rabbi from August 2020 until 2026, with Aron Rubin as assistant rabbi. The congregation held a farewell for him in May 2026. Glass received his BA in Philosophy, MA in Jewish Philosophy, and Semikhah at Yeshiva University and spent over two years learning in Yeshivat Hakotel in Jerusalem. Prior to his studies in Israel, he graduated from the King David High School, Manchester in the UK.

Ezra Cohen succeeded Glass as rabbi in August 2026. He was previously assistant rabbi at Lower Merion Synagogue in Pennsylvania.

As of 2008 Beth Israel Abraham Voliner was only Orthodox synagogue in Kansas City. As of 2010 it was the only Orthodox synagogue in the State of Kansas.
