= Beth Israel Congregation (Florence, South Carolina) =

Reform synagogue in South Carolina, United States

- Hebrew: בית ישראל
- Location in South Carolina

Religion
- Affiliation: Reform Judaism
- Ecclesiastical or organisational status: Synagogue
- Leadership: Rabbi Lauren S. Cohn
- Status: Active

Location
- Location: 316 Park Avenue, Florence, South Carolina
- Country: United States
- Coordinates: 34°11′34″N 79°46′42″W

Architecture
- Type: Synagogue
- Established: 1912 (as a congregation)
- Completed: 1949

Website
- bethisraelflorence.org

Beth Israel Congregation (Hebrew: בית ישראל) is a Reform Jewish synagogue located at 316 Park Avenue in Florence, South Carolina, in the United States. Formally incorporated with the state of South Carolina in September 1912, Beth Israel grew out of the Florence Hebrew Benevolent Association which was founded in 1887.

In 2025, the congregation hired Rabbi Lauren S. Cohn to lead the congregation. A part-time rabbi, Aaron Sherman, became the spiritual leader of Beth Israel in August 2011. Leah Doberne-Schor also served as a part-time rabbi until August 2023. In 2009, the rabbi was Jeffrey Ronald. For services that are conducted in the absence of a Rabbi, temple members lead services.
