= Reconstructionist Congregation Beth Israel =

Reconstructionist synagogue in Ridgewood, New Jersey

- Location in New Jersey

Religion
- Affiliation: Reconstructionist Judaism
- Ecclesiastical or organisational status: Synagogue
- Leadership: Rabbi Jacob Lieberman
- Status: Active

Location
- Location: 475 Grove Street, Ridgewood, New Jersey
- Country: United States
- Coordinates: 40°58′05″N 74°06′29″W

Architecture
- Established: 1928 (as a congregation)
- Completed: 1931 (1st location); 2015 (in current location)

Website
- synagogue.org

Reconstructionist Congregation Beth Israel (RCBI) is a Reconstructionist Jewish congregation and synagogue located since January 2015 within Temple Israel & JCC, 475 Grove Street in Ridgewood, New Jersey, in the United States. It is the only Reconstructionist congregation in the area, with a membership drawn from Bergen and Rockland counties.

== History ==
Established in 1928, the congregation moved to prior current location, a former church, in 1931. The building it purchased was the former Maywood Christian Association Church, constructed in 1901. Built in the Shingle style, the structure combined both stone and shingles. It also included "Gothic Revival features, such as tracery windows". The congregation added an extension to the building in 1952 which included meeting and school rooms, and an additional sanctuary.

Originally Conservative, in the 1990s Beth Israel was faced with declining membership and a building that needed significant capital investment. To help address these issues the membership decided to move to the Reconstructionist movement in 1997. By 2001 the congregation had 65 member families.

== Recent years ==
In 2014, the community voted to sell its property and join in a strategic partnership with Temple Israel and Jewish Community Center in Ridgewood, N.J. It was renamed Reconstructionist Congregation Beth Israel. It employs a part-time rabbi, holds its own services, and joins Temple Israel members for joint programs and activities.

Beth Israel participates in the "EZ Key Partnership", a High Holy Day initiative to provide free seats for qualified Bergen County residents. It also offers its own "free seats for first timers" program for High Holy Days.

== Bibliography ==
- Brown, Steven (1985). Higher and higher: Making Jewish Prayer Part of Us. United Synagogue of Conservative Judaism.
