= Temple Beth Israel (Fresno, California) =

Reform Jewish synagogue in California, US

Beth Israel
- Hebrew: בית ישראל
- Location in California

Religion
- Affiliation: Reform Judaism
- Ecclesiastical or organizational status: Synagogue
- Leadership: Rabbi Rick Winer
- Status: Active

Location
- Location: 6622 North Maroa Avenue, Fresno, California
- Country: United States
- Interactive map of Beth Israel
- Coordinates: 36°50′04″N 119°47′57″W

Architecture
- Type: Synagogue architecture
- Established: 1919 (as a congregation)

Website
- tbifresno.org

Temple Beth Israel (Hebrew: בית ישראל) is a Reform Jewish congregation and synagogue located at 6622 North Maroa Avenue in Fresno, California, in the United States. Founded in 1919, it was the first and remains the oldest synagogue in the San Joaquin Valley.

As of 2011, the rabbi was Rick Winer.
