= Temple Beth Israel (York, Pennsylvania) =

Reform synagogue in York, Pennsylvania, US

- Location in Pennsylvania

Religion
- Affiliation: Reform Judaism
- Ecclesiastical or organizational status: Synagogue
- Leadership: Rabbi Jeffrey Astrachan
- Status: Active

Location
- Location: 2090 Hollywood Drive, York, Pennsylvania
- Country: United States
- Interactive map of Temple Beth Israel
- Coordinates: 39°56′38″N 76°41′32″W

Architecture
- Style: Synagogue
- Established: 1877 (as a congregation)
- Completed: 1907 (first synagogue); 1966 (Hollywood Dr.)

Website
- tbiyork.org

Temple Beth Israel is a Reform synagogue located at 2090 Hollywood Drive, York, Pennsylvania, in the United States.

Founded in 1877 as the Hebrew Reformed Congregation Temple Beth Israel, it joined the Union of American Hebrew Congregations (now Union for Reform Judaism) in 1907. That year it completed the construction of its first building, a Moorish Revival brick building topped with large, copper Onion domes.

In 1962 Beth Israel started construction on its current facilities, completing the Religious school wing, auditorium, and social facilities, and in 1966 it completed work on the sanctuary. As of 2011, the rabbi was Jeffrey Astrachan.
