= Congregation Beth Israel (Asheville, North Carolina) =

Synagogue in Asheville, North Carolina, United States

- Hebrew: בית ישראל
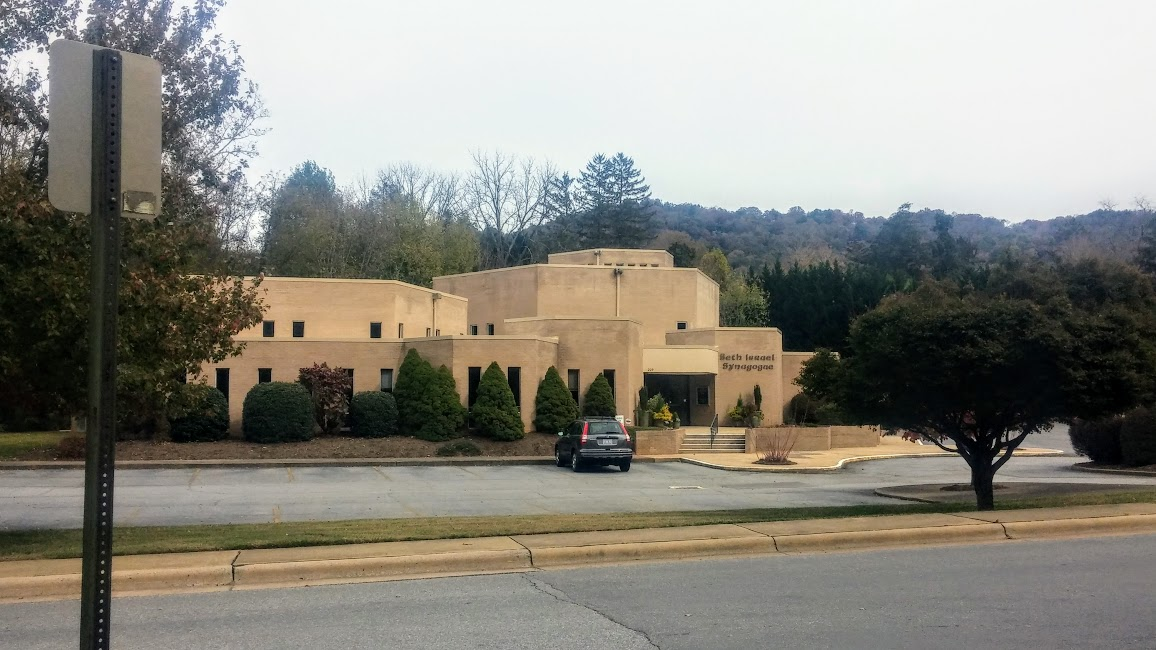
- The synagogue building in 2019

- Location in North Carolina

Religion
- Affiliation: Judaism
- Ecclesiastical or organizational status: Synagogue
- Leadership: Rabbi Mitchell Levine
- Status: Active

Location
- Location: 229 Murdock Avenue, Asheville, North Carolina
- Country: United States
- Interactive map of Congregation Beth Israel
- Coordinates: 35°36′50″N 82°33′06″W

Architecture
- Established: 1899 (as Bikur Cholim congregation)
- Completed: 1913 (South Liberty Street #1); 1924 (South Liberty Street #2); 1969 (Murdock Avenue)

Website
- bethisraelnc.org

Congregation Beth Israel (Hebrew: בית ישראל) is an independent, traditional egalitarian Jewish congregation and synagogue, located at 229 Murdock Avenue in Asheville, North Carolina, in the United States. Founded in 1899 as Bikur Cholim, it was an Orthodox breakaway from Asheville's existing synagogue. It hired its first full-time rabbi in 1909, opened a religious school in 1911, and in 1913 it acquired its first building, which burnt down in 1916.

The congregation completed its second building in 1924, affiliated with Conservative Judaism in 1949, and changed its name to Beth Israel in 1950. It completed construction of its current building in 1969, and renovated it in 2018.

Robert Cabelli joined as rabbi in 2006, and was succeeded by Justin Goldstein in 2014. In 2021, the congregation hired Mitch Levine as rabbi.

== Early history ==
Significant Jewish immigration to Asheville, North Carolina began in 1880, when the railroad link to Asheville was completed. The community founded Asheville's oldest synagogue, Beth HaTephila, as a "conservative" congregation in 1891. This was several decades before the formation the Conservative movement in Judaism, and conservative was generally used to mean a Jewish group that did not follow the Reform movement, and remained either Orthodox or close to it. Beth Israel almost immediately started adopting some Reform movement changes, such as using an organ during services. By 1899, some members of the Jewish community felt Beth HaTephila was not traditional enough, and eight of them founded Bikur Cholim as an Orthodox alternative. Bikur cholim is Hebrew for "visitation of the sick"; the name was used in recognition of the many people who came to Asheville to recuperate from tuberculosis.

The congregation worshiped in a number of locations; for a period, weekly services were held in the Masonic Temple, while High Holiday services were held at the Church Street Odd Fellows Hall. Membership grew very slowly, and the congregation went through a series of rabbis whose terms were generally short. The congregation frequently had no rabbi at all, and High Holiday services were often led by lay members. Solomon Schechter came to Asheville in 1904 to assist in executing a merger of Beth HaTephila and Bikur Cholim, but the negotiations fell through.

== First full-time rabbi, first building ==
In 1909, Louis Londow was hired as the congregation's first full-time rabbi, though he had to open a grocery store to make ends meet. Londow had been considered the "spiritual leader" of the congregants since 1897 (before Bikur Cholim had been formally incorporated), when two of the founding members, S.H. Michalove and B. Zageir, had brought him to Asheville from Baltimore. Described as "a model of civility", he "was known to remove his hat whenever he got a phone call from a woman". Londow served until 1912, and was succeeded as rabbi by Ellis Fox, though Londow stayed in Asheville to run his store.

The congregation opened a Talmud Torah school in 1911. That year the congregation also purchased a lot on South Liberty Street for $1000 (today $35,000), and began construction of a synagogue building. Construction took four years, but services were held in the partially constructed building starting with High Holiday services in 1912. That year, just before Rosh Hashanah, Bikur Cholim's building burned down. The total cost had been more than $11,000 (today $325,000), of which insurance covered only $3000. A replacement building (in the same location) was not completed until 1924; its sanctuary had seating for approximately 80 worshipers.

A group broke away from Bikur Cholim in 1916, forming the Anshei Yeshurun congregation. Fox left to become the rabbi of Beth HaTephila in 1917, and was succeeded by Lazarus Lehrer and then D. Hechtor. The members of Anshei Yeshurun rejoined Bikur Cholim in 1921, and the following year a Ladies' Auxiliary (now a Sisterhood) was formed; one of its duties was to bring chicken soup to Jewish patients in Asheville's tuberculosis sanatoria. Londow served again as spiritual leader in the 1920s; other rabbis included Scharfman, Goodcovitz, Kaplivitz, S. Wrubel, G. Berkman, D. Wachfogel, L. Leifer, R. Meier, and J. Seidler.

== Events since 1940 ==
The synagogue continued to experience difficulty keeping Orthodox rabbis in a small Southern city; it had fourteen different spiritual leaders from 1899 to 1949, and seven from 1940 to 1953. For a number of years the congregation had been moving away from its previous traditionalism, using English (as well as Hebrew) in the prayers, and having mixed seating for men and women. In 1949, it formally affiliated with the United Synagogue of Conservative Judaism; (Note: The congregation claims that both changes happened in 1951, while other sources indicate that Beth Israel was Conservative at that time, and that the affiliation with the United Synagogue happened in 1949 and name was changed in 1950.) that year the rabbi was Martin Kessler. Kessler had come to Bikur Cholim from England in 1948 to serve as rabbi; although the congregation liked him, his wife was not happy in Asheville, so they left in 1949.

Bikur Cholim changed its name to Beth Israel in 1950. In the 1950s, the congregation also voted to shorten its Shabbat morning service and start it two hours earlier at 8:00am, so that worshipers could open their stores after services; this change was reversed in the 1970s.

Alexander Gelberman joined Beth Israel as rabbi in 1956, and stayed until August 1964, when he moved to lead a synagogue in Oak Ridge Tennessee. The following November Samuel A. Friedman joined as spiritual leader. Friedman had previously served for over 20 years as rabbi of Congregation B'nai Israel in Wilmington, North Carolina.

In response to rumors that the area around the Liberty Street synagogue was slated for urban renewal, Beth Israel purchased a lot at the corner of Norwood and Murdock Avenues in 1959. The Asheville Development Commission purchased the synagogue property on Liberty Street in the 1960s. After a major fundraising campaign, Beth Israel constructed its current synagogue building at 229 Murdock Avenue in 1969, dedicated by then-rabbi Samuel Friedman. The old property eventually became a parking lot of a Best Western hotel. Membership grew steadily throughout the 1980s and 1990s, from 70 families in 1980, to 100 in 1990, to almost 200 in 1999. The rabbi at that time was Shmuel Birnham.

Around 2014, Beth Israel disaffiliated from the United Synagogue of Conservative Judaism, becoming an independent congregation. According to synagogue members, this action was taken primarily because the congregation disagreed with the Conservative movement's then limited acceptance of same-sex couples and interfaith families.

Robert Cabelli joined as rabbi in August 2006. Cabelli had worked as a neurobiologist, research scientist, and professor before being ordained at the Ziegler School of Rabbinic Studies and joining Beth Israel. By 2009, membership remained at 200 families.

Justin Goldstein joined as rabbi in January 2014. Born and raised near Chicago, he attended Hampshire College where he produced an original translation and commentary of most of the Book of Genesis. Goldstein was ordained in 2011 by the Ziegler School of Rabbinic Studies.

In 2015, the congregation began working on plans to renovate the building at 229 Murdock. In the fall of 2017 they temporarily moved locations to the basement of Congregation Beth HaTephila while the building was being renovated, and returned to 229 Murdock in December 2018. Membership had fallen to 150 families.

The congregation hired Mitch Levine as rabbi in 2021. Before joining Congregation Beth Israel, Levine served for 10 years as rabbi of Agudas Achim in Bexley, OH, and prior to that was rabbi at Beth Sholem in Providence, RI. His rabbinic training has included studies at the Jewish Theological Seminary, Harvard Jewish Theological Seminary, the Reconstructionist Rabbinical College, and the Pardes Institute of Jewish Learning. He is married to Dr. Alison Rose, a Jewish educator.
