= Beth Israel Synagogue (Cambridge, Massachusetts) =

Historic former Reform synagogue in Massachusetts

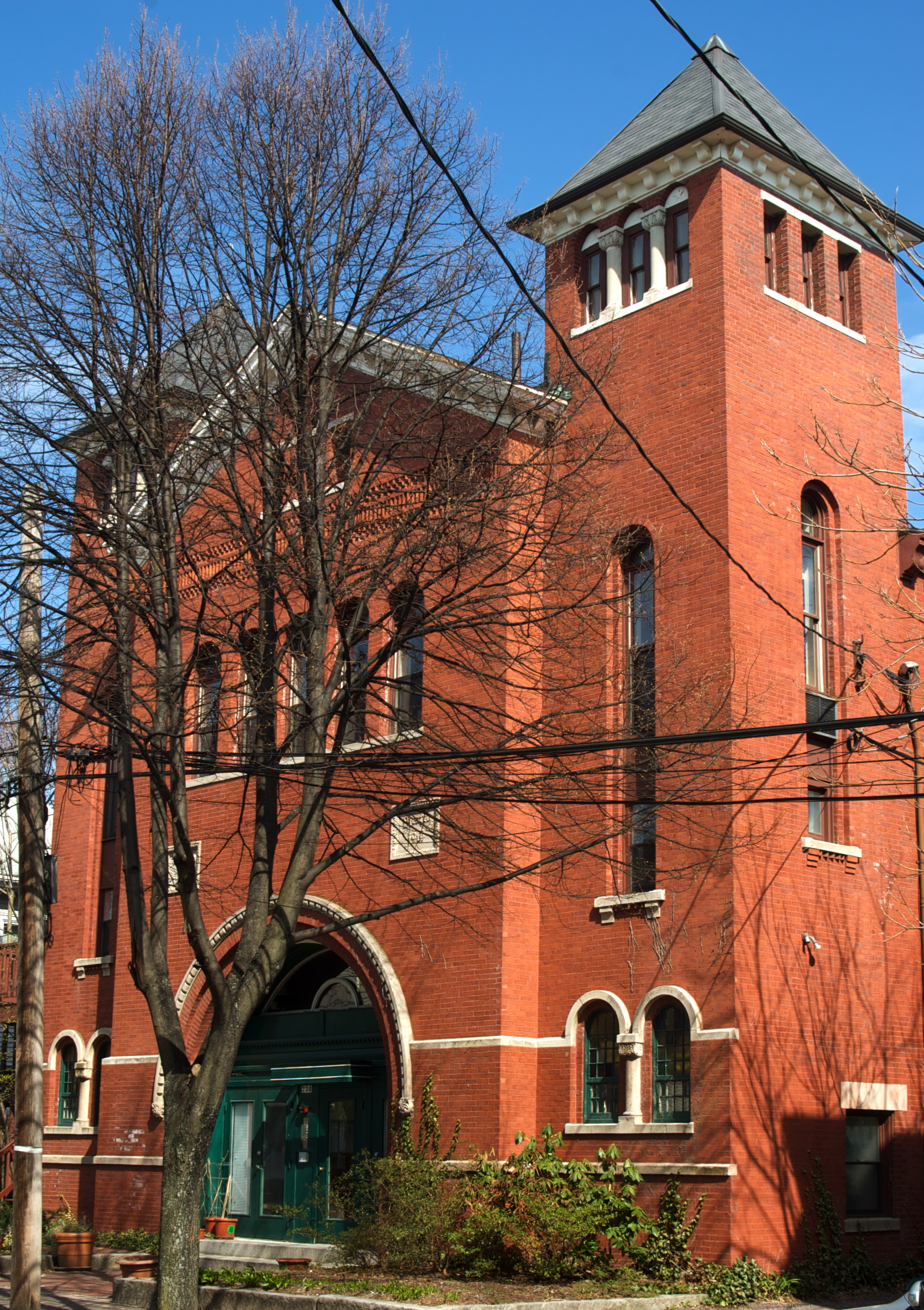
- The former synagogue, in 2010

- Location of the former synagogue in Massachusetts

Religion
- Affiliation: Conservative Judaism (former)
- Rite: Sephardic
- Ecclesiastical or organizational status: Synagogue (1903–1962); Residential apartments
- Status: Closed; and repurposed

Location
- Location: 238 Columbia Street, Cambridge, Middlesex County, Massachusetts
- Country: United States
- Interactive map of Beth Israel Synagogue
- Coordinates: 42°22′9″N 71°05′46″W

Architecture
- Architect: Nathan Douglass
- Type: Synagogue
- Style: Romanesque Revival
- Established: 1900 (as a congregation)
- Completed: 1903
- Beth Israel Synagogue
- U.S. National Register of Historic Places
- Area: less than one acre
- MPS: Cambridge MRA
- NRHP reference No.: 82001921
- Added to NRHP: April 13, 1982

Beth Israel Synagogue is a historic former Jewish synagogue building at 238 Columbia Street in Cambridge, Middlesex County, Massachusetts, in the United States. Built in 1903, it was the first and principal synagogue to serve the East Cambridge area, and is a fine local example of Romanesque Revival architecture. Now converted into residential condominiums, it was listed on the National Register of Historic Places in 1982.

== Description ==
The former Beth Israel Synagogue stands in The Port neighborhood of eastern Cambridge, on the east side of Columbia Street, between Hampshire and Market Streets. It is a two-story brick building with a gabled roof and flanking square towers. Its Romanesque Revival styling includes bands of narrow round-arch windows and a large Syrian arch sheltering the main entrance. Brick corbelling adorns the eaves of the pyramidal tower roofs, and is featured in multiple bands at the base of the front gable. The building was designed by Nathan Douglass and completed in 1903.

== History ==
The known history of Jewish worship in East Cambridge begins in 1898, with the founding of the Sephardic Congregation Anshai Sfard. It originally met in private residences. Congregation Beth Israel was founded in 1900, and construction was begun on this building in 1901. In 1906 the congregation divided over doctrinal differences, resulting in the founding of Congregation Agudath Ashkenazim. Congregation Anshai Sfard merged with Beth Israel in 1957. In 1962 Beth Israel and Agudath Ashkenazim merged to form Temple Beth Shalom of Cambridge, and the new congregation chose to use the Temple Ashkenaz building on Tremont Street in Cambridge, now widely known as the Tremont Street Shul.

By 1982, the Beth Israel building, no longer used as a synagogue, was taken over by the Cambridge Redevelopment Authority, and was added to the National Register of Historic Places. The former synagogue building currently houses condominium units.

== Gallery ==
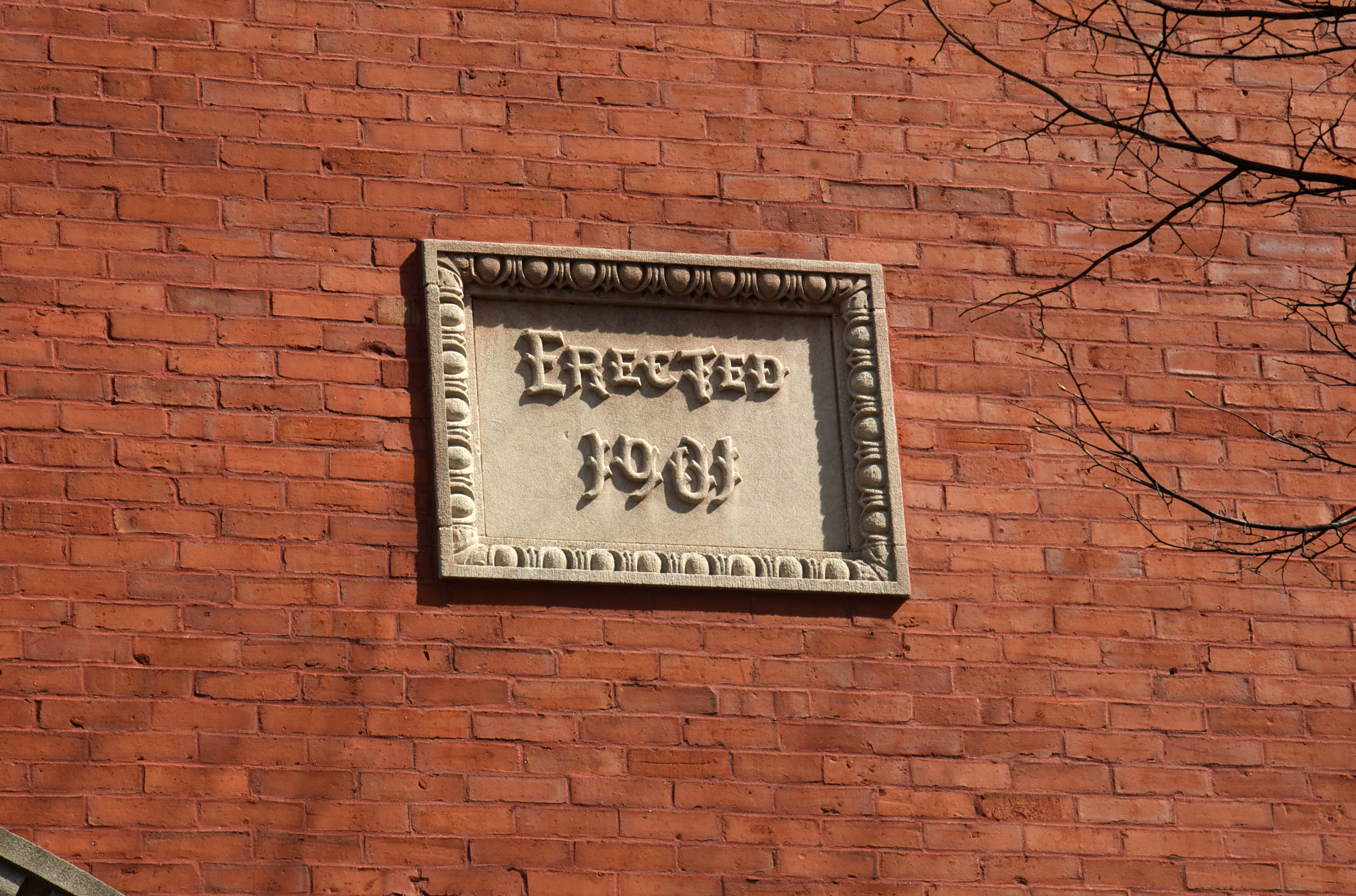
Erected 1901

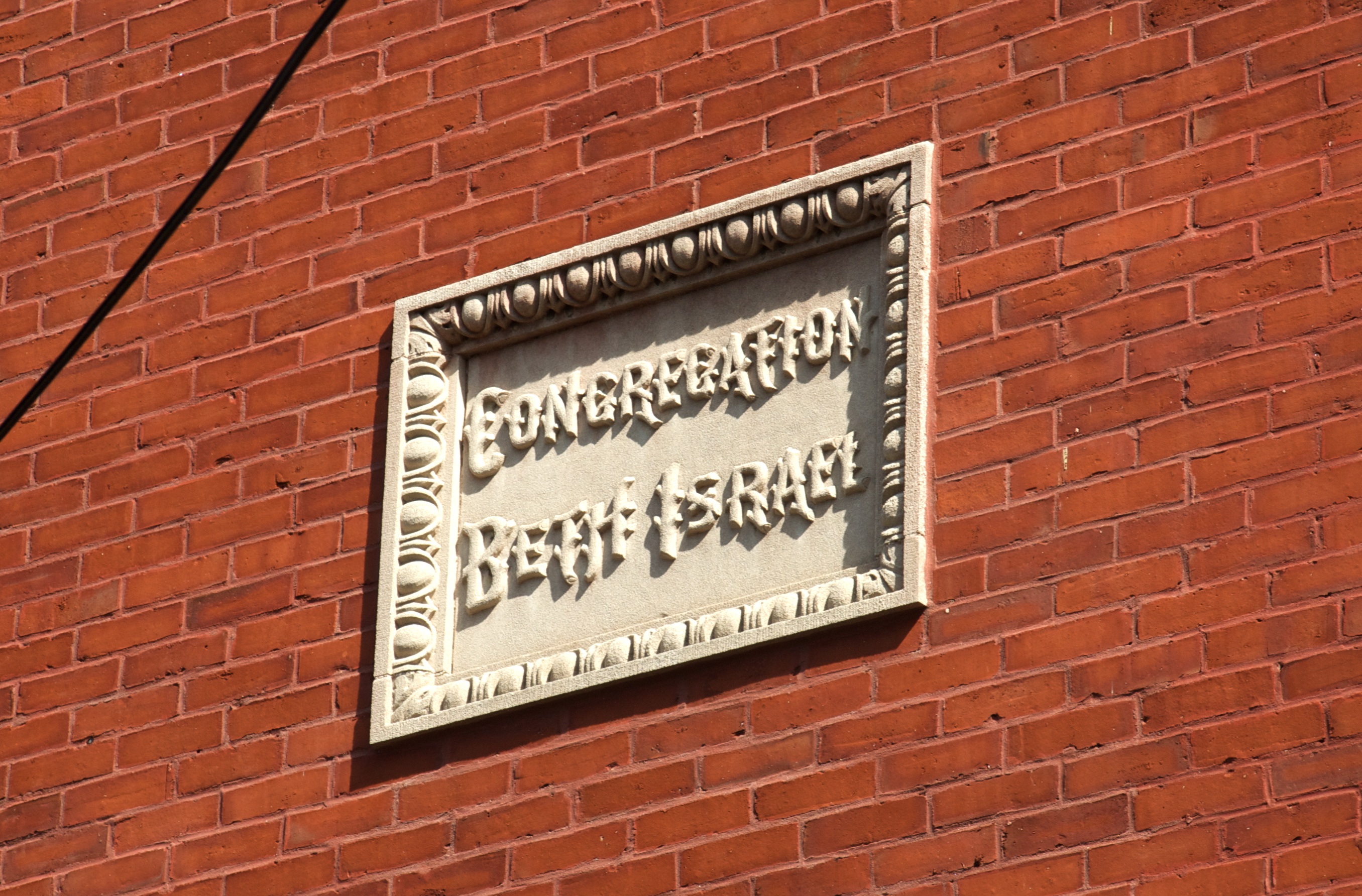
Congregation Beth Israel

== See also ==
- National Register of Historic Places listings in Cambridge, Massachusetts
- History of the Jews in the United States
