= Congregation Beth Israel (Bangor, Maine) =

Beth Israel
- Hebrew: בית ישראל
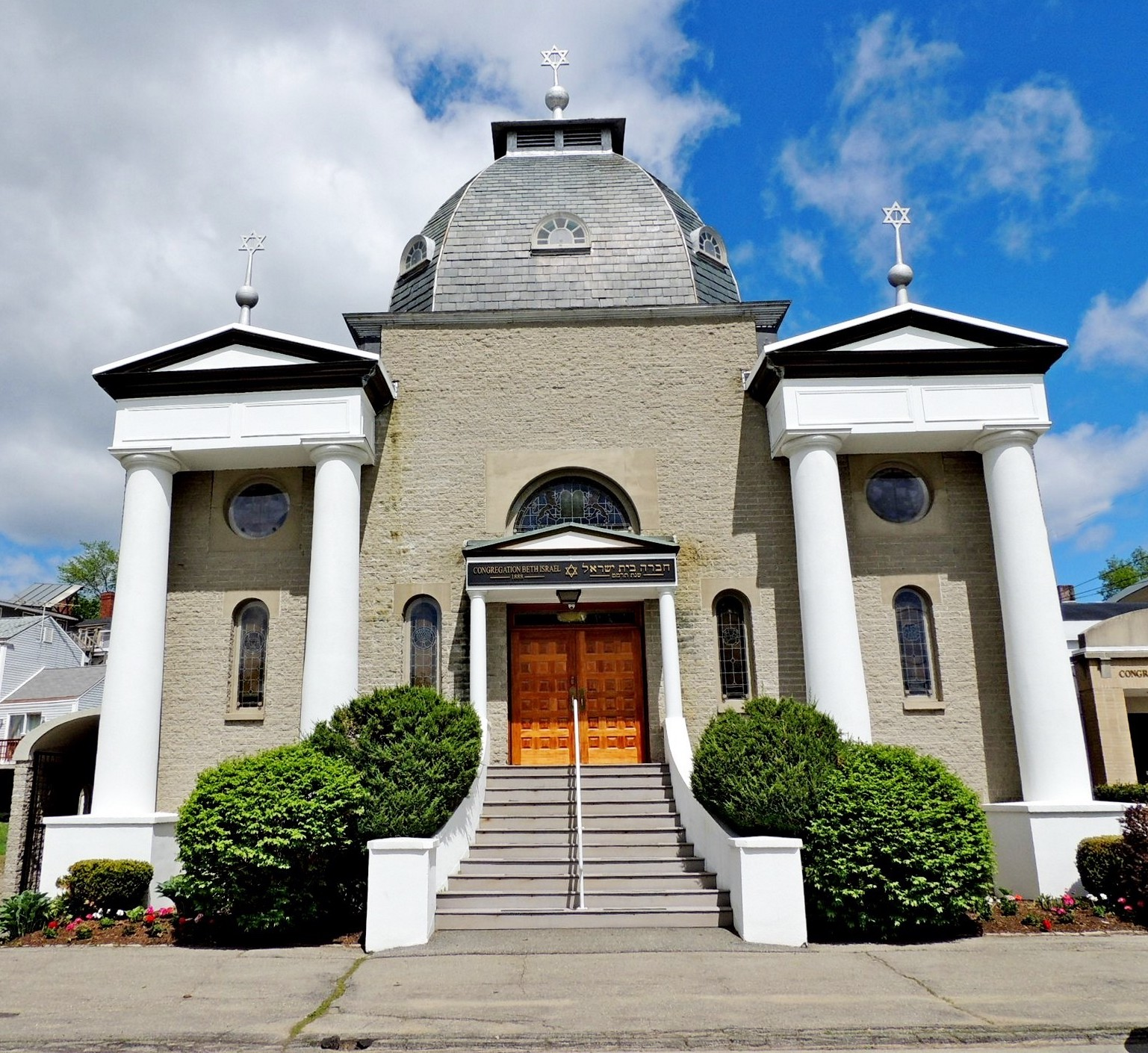
- Beth Israel synagogue in 2015

Religion
- Affiliation: Conservative Judaism
- Ecclesiastical or organisational status: Synagogue
- Leadership: Rabbi Bill Siemers
- Status: Active

Location
- Location: 144 York Street, Bangor, Maine
- Country: United States
- Interactive map of Beth Israel
- Coordinates: 44°48′11″N 68°45′52″W

Architecture
- Type: Synagogue
- Style: Byzantine-Romanesque
- Established: 1888 (as a congregation)
- Completed: 1897 (1st synagogue); 1913 (current synagogue)

Website
- cbisrael.org

Congregation Beth Israel (Hebrew: בית ישראל) is a Conservative synagogue, located for most of its history at 144 York Street in Bangor, Maine, in the United States. The oldest continuously operating synagogue in Maine, it was organized in 1888 after an influx to Maine of Lithuanian and Polish Jews. There was a previous community of German Jews from the 1850s named Congregation Ahawas Achim (founded in 1849), who gradually assimilated or left Maine, leaving behind the Webster Street cemetery plot now maintained by the Bangor Jewish community.

The synagogue has an active Sisterhood, leads a community-wide Chevra Kadisha, and has an active Hebrew school.

Congregation Beth Israel has taken on Torah scrolls and memorial boards for Temple Israel in Old Town, Maine, Congregation Chiam Yosef in Calais, Maine, and the Aroostook Hebrew Community synagogue in Presque Isle, Maine.

== Early history ==
The first of Beth Israel's founders, Ezriel Lemke Allen, arrived in Bangor in 1882, after Ike Wolper, an Oldtown peddler, convinced him to leave Boston to pursue work in Maine. They were joined by Jacob Altman, Harry Cohen, Israel Goldman, Joe Byer, Joe Bernstein, Marks Goldman, Philip Hillson, and Simon Kominsky forming the first formal minyan of Bangor's Eastern European Jewish community. When they were joined by mohel and shochet Morris Golden, their rituals became more formal, and with a Torah on loan from Ohabei Shalom of Boston, in October 1888 they created the Beth Israel Society.

On August 22, 1897, the cornerstones were emplaced on Center Street, between Cumberland and Garland Street. This would be the first synagogue constructed in the state of Maine.

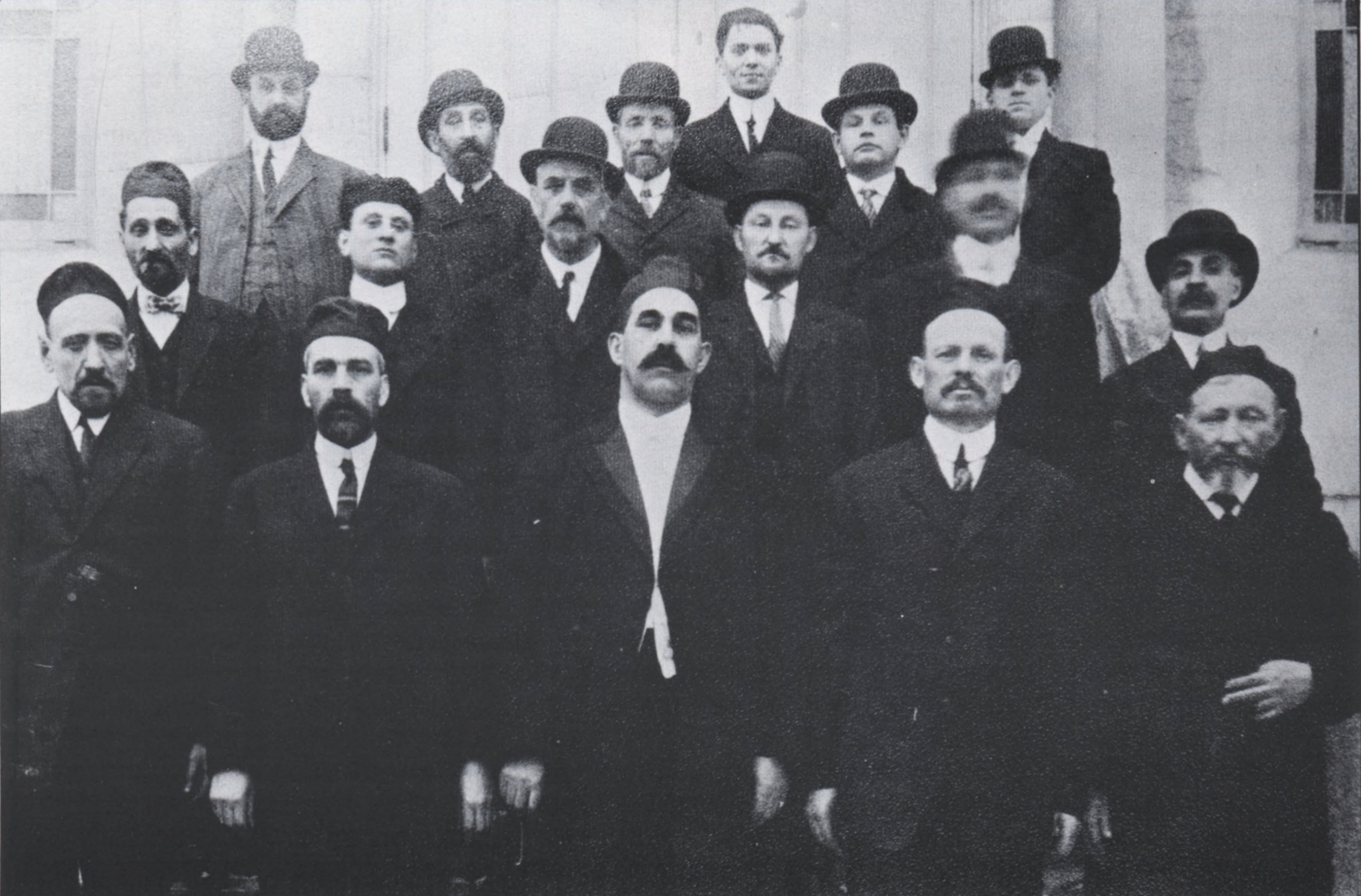
The 1913 Board of Directors

On April 30, 1911, the Great Fire of 1911 destroyed much of downtown Bangor, and Beth Israel's Center Street building along with it. With a $4000 insurance payment as the basis, on March 9, 1913, the present Beth Israel building was dedicated. It features Byzantine-Romanesque architecture to reflect the origins of Jewish life in Asia Minor.

== Leadership ==
Rabbi	Years	Religious affiliation	Notes
Louis Seltzer	1903 - 1906	Orthodox	
Louis Plotkin	1906 - 1909	Orthodox	
Mordecai Klatchko	1909 - 1912	Orthodox	
Moishe Shohet	1912 - 1921	Orthodox	
Eliezer Levine	1925 - 1930	Orthodox	Simultaneously served Congregation Beth Abraham of Bangor.
Bernard L. Berzon	1937 - 1939	Orthodox	
Moishe Zucker	1945 - 1947	Orthodox	Simultaneously served Congregation Beth Abraham of Bangor.
Avraham Freedman	1949 - 1969	Orthodox	
Irving A. Margolies	1971 - 1976	Orthodox	
Alan M. Kalinsky	1976 - 1981	Orthodox	
Joseph P. Schonberger	1982 - 1997	Conservative	
Yisrael Rod Brettler	1998 - 2000	Conservative	
David Cantor	2001 - 2007	Conservative	
Steven Schwarzman	2008 - 2011	Conservative	
Justin Goldstein	2011 - 2013	Conservative	
Bill Siemers	2014 - present	Conservative	
