= Beth Israel Synagogue (New Haven, Connecticut) =

Orthodox historic synagogue in New Haven, Connecticut, US

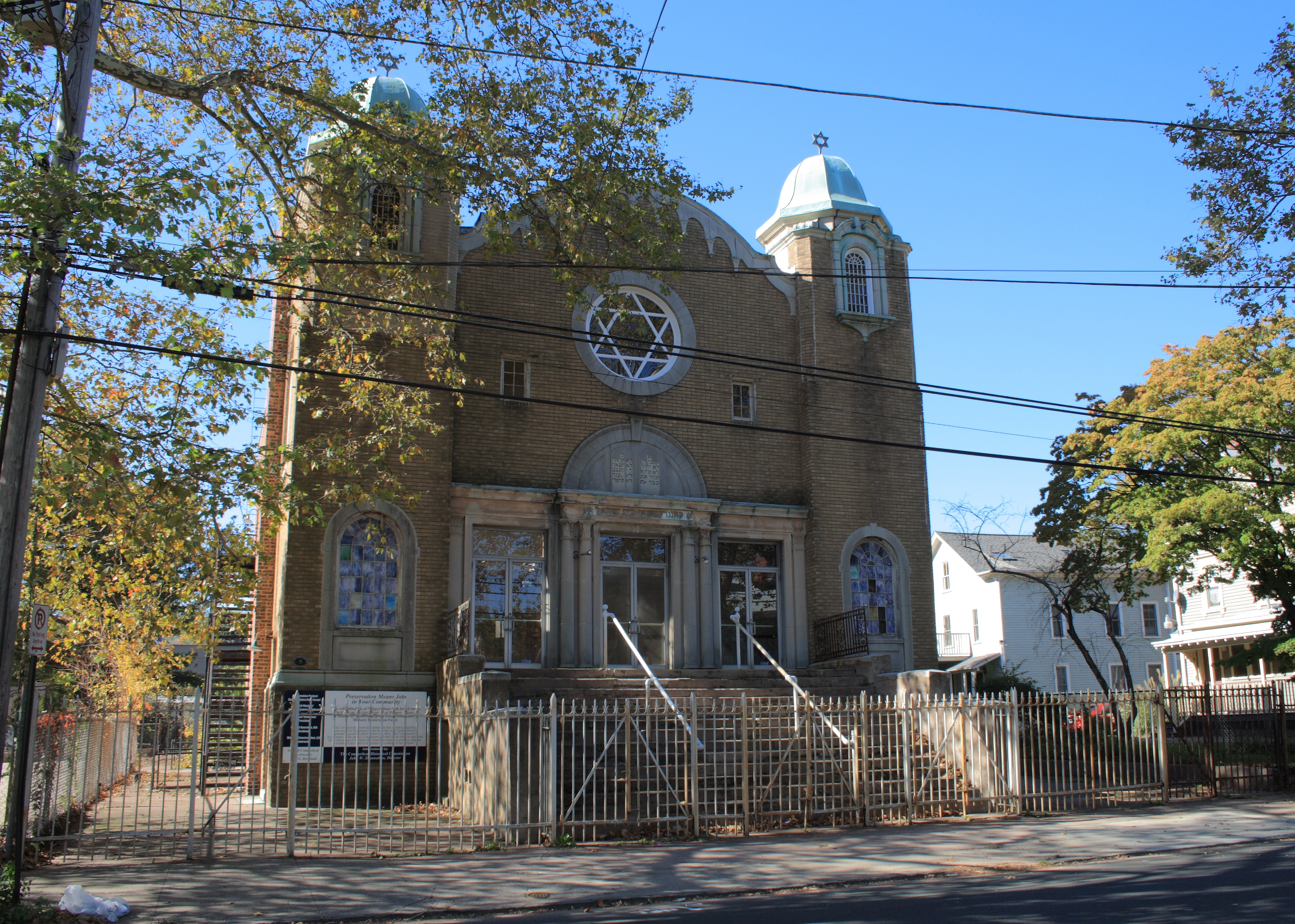
- The synagogue building, in 2008

- Location in Connecticut

Religion
- Affiliation: Orthodox Judaism
- Ecclesiastical or organizational status: Synagogue
- Leadership: Rabbi Mendy Hecht
- Status: Active

Location
- Location: 232 Orchard Street, New Haven, Connecticut
- Country: United States
- Interactive map of Beth Israel Synagogue
- Coordinates: 41°17′54″N 72°56′25″W

Architecture
- Architect: Louis Abramowitz
- Type: Synagogue architecture
- Style: Colonial Revival
- General contractor: C. Abbadessa
- Established: 1913 (as a congregation)
- Completed: 1925

Website
- orchardstreetshul.org
- Beth Israel Synagogue
- U.S. National Register of Historic Places
- Area: less than one acre
- MPS: Historic Synagogues of Connecticut MPS
- NRHP reference No.: 95000578
- Added to NRHP: May 11, 1995

Congregation Beth Israel, also known as the Orchard Street Shul, is an Orthodox Jewish congregation and synagogue, located at 232 Orchard Street in New Haven, Connecticut, in the United States. The synagogue building is listed on the National Register of Historic Places.

== History ==
The congregation was founded in 1913 by an Orthodox congregation that was formed by Jewish families who had prospered sufficiently to move beyond the neighborhood of first immigrant settlement around Oak and Lafayette Streets to the area of upper Oak Street (renamed Legion Avenue in 1928) and Winthrop Avenue. First meeting in leased space, in 1915 the congregation moved into a remodeled house at 147 Orchard Street. In 1923 they purchased a lot at 232 Orchard Street for $12,000 (today $227,000) and built the present Colonial revival style building in 1925. The architect was Louis Abramowitz and the builder was C. Abbadessa.

By the late twentieth century, the membership was elderly, the Jewish population of the city had moved elsewhere, and the future of the synagogue was in doubt. Efforts to preserve the synagogue were organized by the Cultural Heritage Artists Project and the synagogue returned to regular weekly use in 2011.

The synagogue was listed on the National Register of Historic Places in 1995.

== See also ==
- National Register of Historic Places listings in New Haven County, Connecticut
