= History of the Jews in Utah =

Jewish pioneers first arrived in Utah after the 1849 gold rush. The first instance of organized Judaism in Utah was the creation of the Hebrew Benevolent Society in 1864.

== Early Jewish pioneers in Utah ==
Two Jewish families had been converted to Mormonism during Joseph Smith's lifetime. Frederick Levi and his family were baptized in 1837 in Canada, Alexander Neibaur and his family were baptized in 1838. Frederick Levi's son David arrived in Utah in 1848, with the rest of the family arriving in 1850. Alexander Neibaur also arrived in Uth.

Other Jews came to Utah Territory after the 1849 gold rush, with Levi Abrams arriving by 1853. The trip was dangerous enough that insurance companies restricted activities of policy holders who wished to travel around the West. Jews who took the overland route included Solomon N. Carvalho, Julius and Fanny Brooks, Meyer Rosenberg, Berry Marks, Morris Rosenbaum, Nicholas S. Ransohoff, Eli Ransohoff, Samuel Kahn, Abraham and Adam Kuhn, Meyer Cohn, and Gumpert Goldberg. Other early Jewish pioneers went West by sea, landing in California before coming to Utah. Those early pioneers who took the sea included Abraham Watters, Aaron Greenewald and Charles Popper. Later, organizations such as the Jewish Industrial Removal Office helped Jews relocate from the crowded cities of the East Coast to places in the west. Businesses founded by Jews did well and by 1878 many villages throughout Utah had at least one Jewish store.

Many of the early Jewish pioneers in Utah were young, unmarried men. During the first years, these young men, who were often clerks or merchants, slept in narrow quarters in the back of their stores and did their own housework. They often ate at restaurants in the city. Keeping Kosher was very difficult, if not impossible, but they did the best they could to fulfill their dietary laws. Two of the earliest Jewish merchants to come to Utah were Nicholas S. Ransohoff and Samuel Kahn. Ransohoff was a merchant, but he also freighted goods across the plains. He had close commercial relationships with several Latter-day Saint authorities and transacted business with Brigham Young several times. Kahn worked as a freighter as well, and eventually established one of the biggest wholesale grocers in Utah Territory. The majority of the Jewish merchants who arrived in Utah in the mid-1860s had previously been settled in California mining camps, but as mining opportunities in California subsided, these merchants sought a better place for permanent settlement.

== Jewish activity in Utah ==
The first instance of organized Judaism in Utah was the creation of the Hebrew Benevolent Society in 1864. Brigham Young deeded land to the Jewish community, and the first Jewish cemetery was founded in 1866. After the transcontinental railroad was completed in 1869, many more Jewish families came to Utah. The first Jewish congregation established in Utah was Congregation B'nai Israel, established in 1873 by Samuel Kahn, Louis Reggel, Isadore Morris, M. C. Phillips, Mr. Gansler, Isaac Woolf, and I. Watters. Jewish service organization B'nai Brith founded a lodge in Salt Lake in 1892, as well as a sister chapter in 1923. The National Council of Jewish Women founded a chapter in Salt Lake in 1941. Hadassah founded a Salt Lake chapter in 1943.

Jews participated in several areas during World War I, including in the armed forces, the Red Cross, and other supporting organizations. Jewish activity boomed in the World War II war effort. Jewish Utahns once again served in the armed forces, worked with the Red Cross, and sold savings bonds.

=== Jews in Salt Lake City ===
The development of the Jewish community in Salt Lake City followed the historic national trend. The first Jewish couple to settle in Utah were Julius and Fanny Brooks, who settled in Salt Lake City in 1853. They came from Illinois in a company of wagons.

Photographer and painter Solomon Nunes Carvalho arrived in Parowan, Utah, on 7 February 1854. A few weeks later he made his way to Salt Lake City. In order to fund his travel home, he set up a business as a portrait painter. He painted portraits of Brigham Young, Daniel H. Wells, James Ferguson, Seth Blair, Wilford Woodruff, A. O. Smoot, and Feramorz Little.

Utah's Jews were active in community life. The Salt Lake City Directory published in 1874 listed ninety-one Jewish businesses. Fourteen of those had been in business since 1867. In 1903, the Jews of the city and others who supported their cause met to pass a resolution against the Kishinev pogrom in Russia.

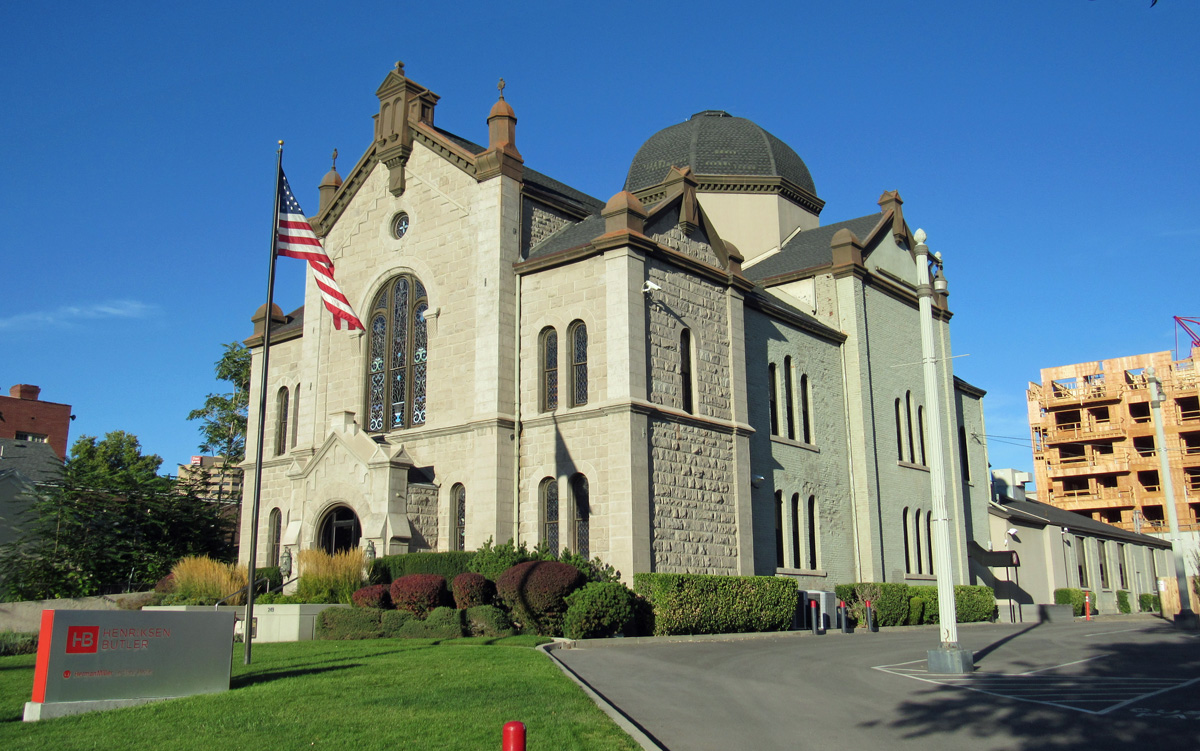
Temple B'Nai Israel in September 2016

Congregation B'nai Israel was founded, first holding Reform services at the Odd Fellows Hall. In 1880, the congregation of St. Mark's Episcopal Church relinquished claim to a burial ground granted to them by the city so that Congregation B'nai Israel could use it. In 1891, Temple B'nai Israel was built. Congregation Montefiore was founded in 1881. Congregation Sharey Tzedek broke off from Congregation Montefiore, and existed until the effects of the Great Depression forced it to close in the early 1930s. The Congregation Sharey Tzedek synagogue's dedication service on 28 March 1920 featured a speech by former Utah governor Simon Bamberger. Many of the members of Congregation Sharey Tzedek were recent Russian and Eastern European arrivals to the United States. Congregations Montefiore and B'nai Israel merged in 1976. The activities of the congregations are often featured in various newspapers, whether concerning High Holy Days or sermons. They have been featured in newspapers from the formation of the congregations to the present.

=== Jews in Ogden ===
Ogden was the route through which many new arrivals to Utah were routed after the completion of the railroad. Jewish immigrants often stayed in Ogden for a time before continuing on to their final destinations.

The first Jewish congregation in Ogden was established in 1890, when Congregation Ohab Sholem was founded. There was no synagogue in Ogden at the time, so the congregation met in various places. The first meetings were held at 352 25th St, which was a clothing store owned by congregation member Ben Oppman. The congregation was sustained throughout the twentieth century. During the community's celebration of Purim in 1911, plans to build a synagogue were announced. In 1917, the name of the congregation was changed to Congregation Brith Sholem. In 1921, the synagogue in Ogden was built. At the laying of the cornerstone for the synagogue, the principal address was given by former Utah governor Simon Bamberger. The congregation was incorporated in 1922. Congregation Brith Sholem started as an Orthodox congregation, but is now a Reform synagogue. The synagogue suffered an arson fire in December 1989, but recovered with the help of the Ogden community.

By the 1920s, between thirty to fifty Jewish families had settled in Ogden. The number of Jewish families in Ogden presently are forty-five. The Jewish population in Ogden has remained constant throughout the twentieth century.

== Jewish congregations in Utah ==
=== Salt Lake City ===
- Bais Menachem (Orthodox)
- B'Nai Israel Temple (historic)
- Chavurah B'Yachad (Reconstructionist)
- Congregation Kol Ami (Reform/Conservative)
- Congregation Montefiore Synagogue (historic)
- Congregation Sharey Tzedek Synagogue (historic)

=== Ogden ===
- Congregation Brith Sholem (Reform)

=== Park City ===
- Temple Har Shalom (Reform)

== Jewish settlements in Utah ==
- Clarion, Utah

== Notable Utah Jews ==
- Simon Bamberger – former Utah Governor. First non-Latter-day-Saint to hold the position. He was beloved because he was "human." He served those in need and treated everyone equally with no regard to their station.
- Julian Bamberger – former Utah Senator.
- Louis Marcus – former Mayor of Salt Lake City.
- Maurice Warshaw – founder of Grand Central, Inc., which was acquired by Fred Meyer in 1984.
- Benjamin Brown – founder of a poultry and egg distribution organization which became the Utah Poultry Association.
- Roseanne Barr – actress, comedian, writer, producer.
- Samuel Newhouse – entrepreneur and mining magnate.
- Paul W. Draper - Magician who grew up in Holladay, Utah
