= Jacob Moritz =

German-American brewer and subject of Utah urban legends

Jacob Moritz (February 22, 1849 – June 9, 1910) was a German-American brewing entrepreneur and political figure in Salt Lake City, Utah. He was the founder of the Salt Lake City Brewing Company, which grew to be one of the largest industrial breweries in the Western United States during the late 19th century. In modern times, Moritz is widely known in popular culture as the occupant of "Emo's Grave," a prominent site of urban legend within the Salt Lake City Cemetery.

== Early life and career ==
Jacob Moritz was born in Ingenheim, Germany, in 1849. He immigrated to the United States in 1865 at the age of 16, initially finding employment at the F. & M. Schaefer Brewing Company in New York City. Seeking further opportunities in the brewing trade, he moved to St. Louis to work for Anheuser-Busch before briefly attempting a mining career in Helena, Montana.

Moritz arrived in the Utah Territory in 1871. He established the Little Montana Brewery, which experienced rapid growth and necessitated a move to a larger facility at 1000 East and 500 South in Salt Lake City. This site eventually became the headquarters of the Salt Lake City Brewing Company. Under Moritz's management, the brewery achieved an annual capacity of 100,000 barrels and operated dozens of saloons throughout the region.

== Trademark dispute and Prohibition ==
Moritz famously engaged in a protracted legal dispute with Anheuser-Busch over the trademark of "Budweiser." Moritz argued that the term was a descriptive name for a Bohemian style of lager rather than a proprietary brand. However, Anheuser-Busch successfully consolidated control over the name in the United States during the 1890s, and Moritz eventually lost the legal right to market his beer under that label.

Following Utah's statewide ban on alcohol in 1917, the Salt Lake City Brewing Company attempted to adapt its massive production facility to manufacture candy. Unlike competitors who successfully pivoted to "near-beer" or soft drink bottling, the candy venture was a commercial failure. The company ceased operations shortly thereafter and did not reopen following the repeal of Prohibition in 1933.

== Civic life and death ==
Moritz was a prominent member of the Jewish community in Salt Lake City, serving as the president of Congregation B'nai Israel. He was also active in the Liberal Party, an organization largely composed of non-Mormons who opposed the political influence of The Church of Jesus Christ of Latter-day Saints. Despite the religious and political tensions of the era, Moritz was respected across denominational lines for his philanthropy and business acumen.

In 1909, Moritz traveled to Germany to seek treatment for declining health. He died of cancer in June 1910. Following his wishes, his remains were cremated in Germany and his ashes were returned to Salt Lake City to be placed in a family mausoleum in the B'nai Israel (Jewish) section of the city cemetery. His grave is located near other notable figures, including Utah's first Jewish governor, Simon Bamberger.

== "Emo's Grave" legend ==
The Moritz mausoleum is the subject of a long-standing Utah urban legend known as "Emo's Grave." The folklore typically involves a ritual where a person circles the tomb several times while chanting "Emo" and peering through the iron grate. Participants report seeing glowing red eyes or hearing movement from within. Various explanations for the identity of "Emo" exist in local lore, none of which align with the historical life of Moritz.

Due to decades of persistent vandalism caused by the legend, the urn containing Moritz's ashes was eventually removed by his family and reinterred in a private location to ensure its preservation. The empty tomb remains a popular destination for "legend tripping."

== See also ==
- History of the Jews in Utah
- List of urban legends
