= Senator Bamberger =

Senator Bamberger may refer to:

- Julian Bamberger (1889–1967), Utah State Senate, son of Simon Bamberger
- Simon Bamberger (1845–1926), Utah State Senate
