= Congregation Montefiore Synagogue =

Historic synagogue in Salt Lake City, Utah, U.S.

Congregation Montefiore Synagogue (former) Saints Peter and Paul Orthodox Christian Church
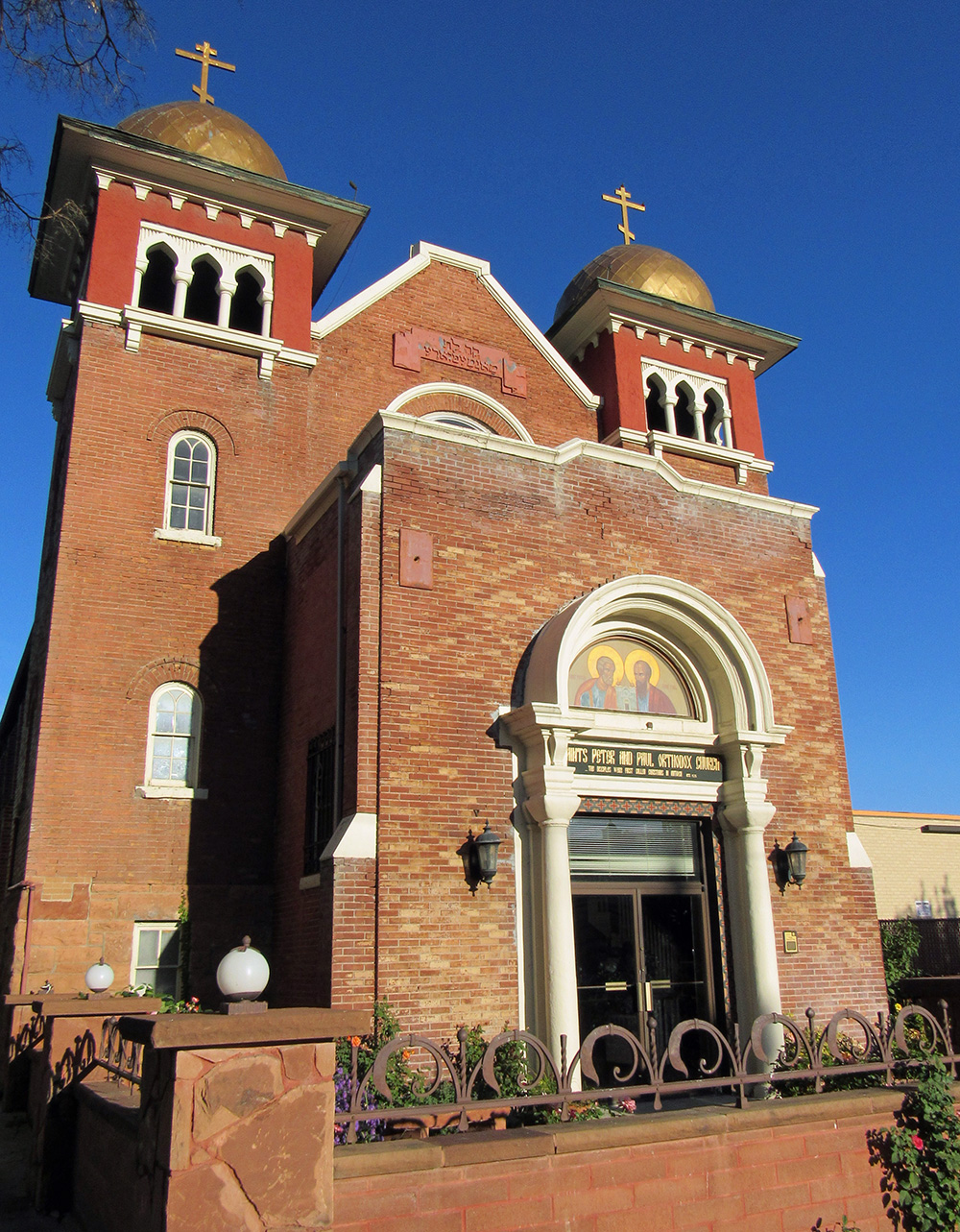
- The former synagogue, now church building in 2016

- The location of the building in Utah

Religion
- Affiliation: Judaism (1903 – 1972); Pentecostalism (1980s); Eastern Orthodoxy (c. 1988)
- Rite: Conservative Judaism; Assemblies of God; Byzantine Rite
- Ecclesiastical or organizational status: Synagogue (1903 – 1972); Church (since the 1980s)
- Status: Closed (Synagogue); Active (Church)

Location
- Location: 355 South 300 East, Salt Lake City, Utah
- Country: United States
- Interactive map of Congregation Montefiore Synagogue (former); Saints Peter and Paul Orthodox Christian Church
- Coordinates: 40°45′40.97″N 111°52′55.02″W

Architecture
- Architect: Carl Neuhausen
- Type: Synagogue
- Style: Moorish Revival
- Completed: 1903
- Construction cost: $9,000
- Congregation Montefiore Synagogue (now Saints Peter and Paul Orthodox Christian Church)
- U.S. National Register of Historic Places
- NRHP reference No.: 85001395
- Added to NRHP: June 27, 1985

The Congregation Montefiore Synagogue is an historic former synagogue, now church, located at 355 South 300 East, in downtown Salt Lake City, Utah, in the United States.

The synagogue was built in 1903 for the local congregation of Jews who followed Conservative Judaism. In the 1970s, the congregation merged with Congregation B'nai Israel to form Congregation Kol Ami and the building was sold. Initially used as a church by the Assemblies of God, currently the former synagogue houses the Saints Peter and Paul Orthodox Christian Church.

== History of the building ==
The Moorish Revival style synagogue was constructed in 1903. It was built on parcel of land given to the congregation by their fellow congregant Morris Levy. The building cost $9,000, $2,000 of which was donated by the Church of Jesus Christ of Latter-day Saints. Following World War II, an addition was built to house the congregation's school. The building was sold following the congregation's merger with Congregation B'nai Israel. Beginning in the late 1980s Metro-Fellowship, a Christian church affiliated with Assemblies of God, was housed in the former synagogue. Currently the building is home to the Saints Peter and Paul Orthodox Christian Church.

== History of Congregation Montefiore ==
This congregation was formed by a group of conservative Jews who had split in the 1880s from Congregation B'nai Israel (which had adopted practices of Reform Judaism). The new conservative congregation took the name of Montefiore from Moses Montefiore. The congregation joined the conservative Jewish United Synagogue of America network in 1966. In 1972 the congregation re-merged with Congregation B'nai Israel to form Congregation Kol Ami.

== See also ==
- B'nai Israel Temple
- Congregation Sharey Tzedek Synagogue
