= Stine, Nevada =

- Ghost town
- Location within Nevada Location within the United States
- Coordinates: 37°29′43″N 114°35′20″W
- Country: United States
- State: Nevada
- County: Lincoln
- Elevation: 4,085 ft (1,245 m)

Stine is an extinct town in Lincoln County, in the U.S. state of Nevada.

== History ==
A post office called Kershaw was established in 1892, the name was changed to Stine in 1904, and the post office closed in 1909. The community was named after Marcus Stine, an owner in the Delamar mining district.

Stine was the site of the coal power plant that transmitted electricity to the Bamberger De Lamar Gold Mines located 13 miles away. In 1909, the power plant was decommissioned and possibly shipped to the Lagoon Resort, which was owned by Simon Bamberger.

Variant names were "Cana" and "Stine Station".
