= Simon Bamberger House =

Historic house in Salt Lake City, Utah, U.S.

- Simon Bamberger Home
- U.S. National Register of Historic Places
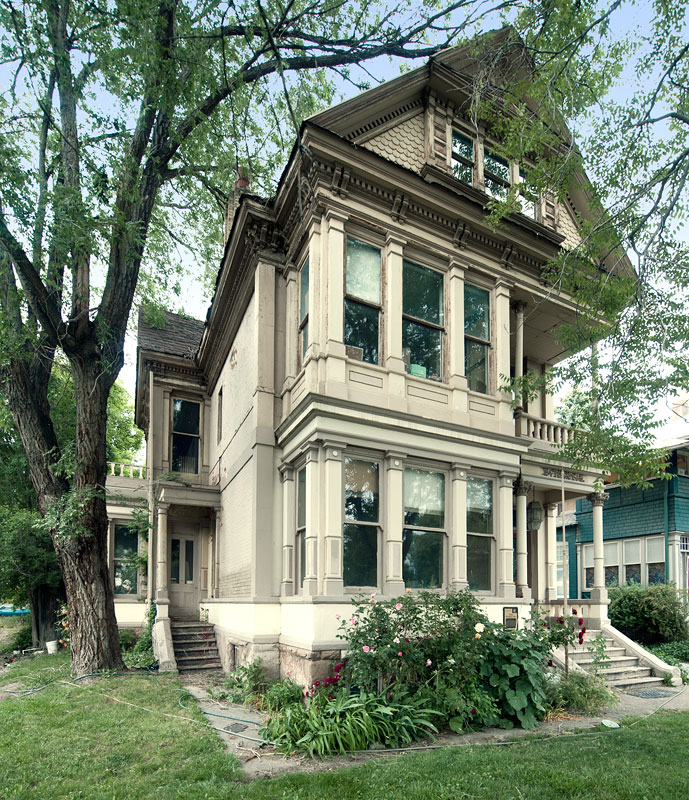

- Location within Utah Location within the United States
- Location: 623 E. 100 South, Salt Lake City, Utah
- Coordinates: 40°46′3″N 111°52′19″W
- Area: less than one acre
- Built: c. 1881–1888
- Architectural style: Late 19th and 20th Century Revivals, Neo-Greek Revival
- NRHP reference No.: 75001814
- Added to NRHP: May 30, 1975

The Simon Bamberger Home, also known as Gardner Manor, is a house in Salt Lake City, Utah, United States, that was built in the 1880s. Its architectural style has been described as a transitional "Pre-Victorian, neo-Greek Revival" type, having obvious characteristics of grandeur and power. It has pilasters, window bays, and a classical Greek entablature. The house is significant primarily for its association with Simon Bamberger, an immigrant who was elected as the fourth governor of Utah in 1916. Bamberger was the first owner of the home.

The house was listed on the National Register of Historic Places in 1975.

== See also ==
- National Register of Historic Places listings in Salt Lake City
