= Billigheim-Ingenheim =

- Municipality
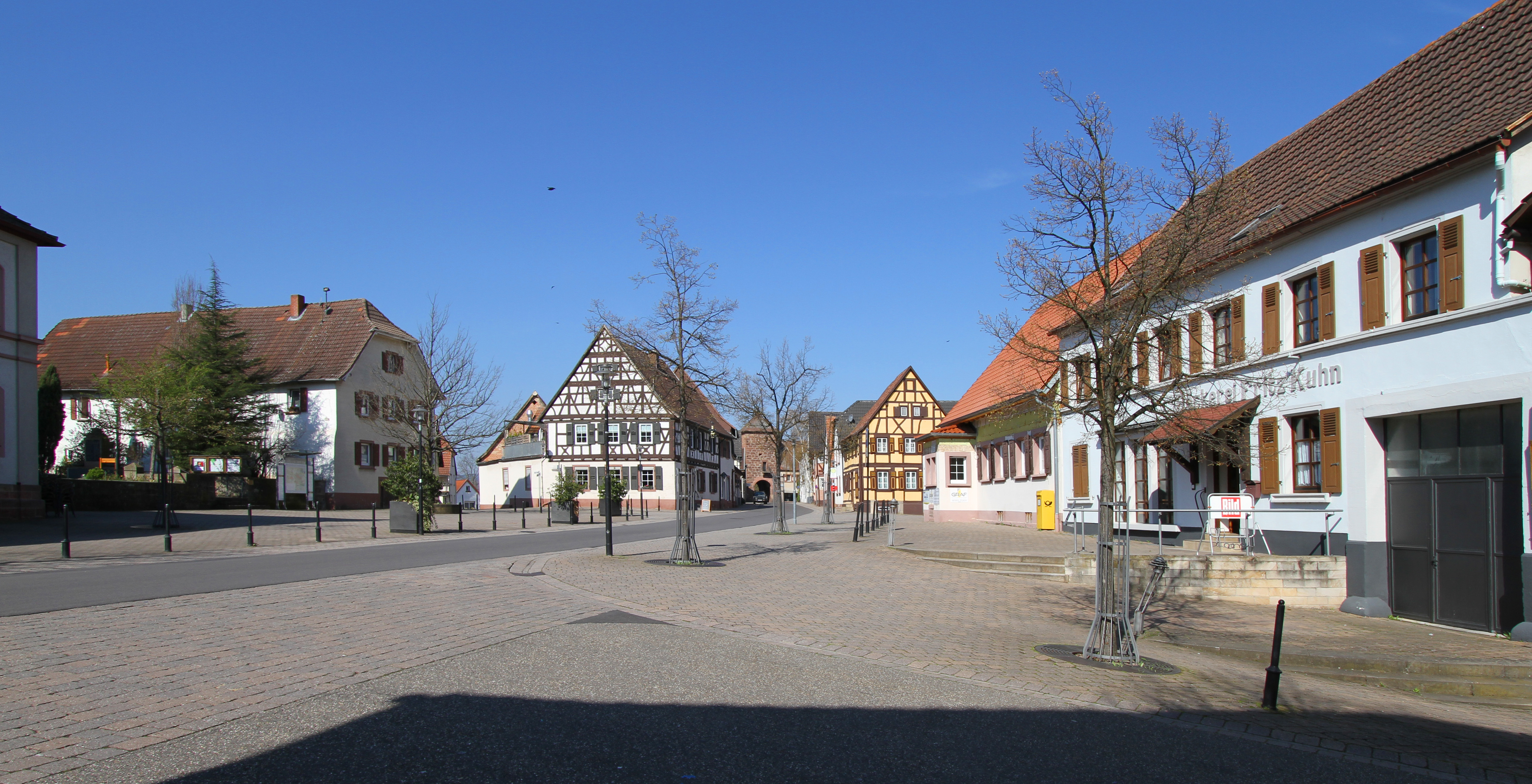
- Billigheim

- Coat of arms

- Location of Billigheim-Ingenheim within Südliche Weinstraße district
- Interactive map of Billigheim-Ingenheim
- Location within Germany Location within Rhineland-Palatinate
- Coordinates: 49°08′20″N 8°05′53″E
- Country: Germany
- State: Rhineland-Palatinate
- District: Südliche Weinstraße
- Municipal assoc.: Landau-Land
- Subdivisions: 4

Government
  - Mayor (2019–24): Dietmar Pfister (SPD)

Area
  - Total: 22.95 km^{2} (8.86 sq mi)
- Elevation: 154 m (505 ft)

Population (2025-12-31)
  - Total: 3,846
  - Density: 167.6/km^{2} (434.0/sq mi)
- Time zone: UTC+01:00 (CET)
  - Summer (DST): UTC+02:00 (CEST)
- Postal codes: 76831
- Dialling codes: 06349
- Vehicle registration: SÜW
- Website: www.billigheim-ingenheim.de

Billigheim-Ingenheim is a municipality in the Südliche Weinstraße district, in Rhineland-Palatinate, Germany. It consists of four districts: Billigheim, Ingenheim, Appenhofen, and Mühlhofen.

== Photo gallery ==
Billigheim-Ingenheim

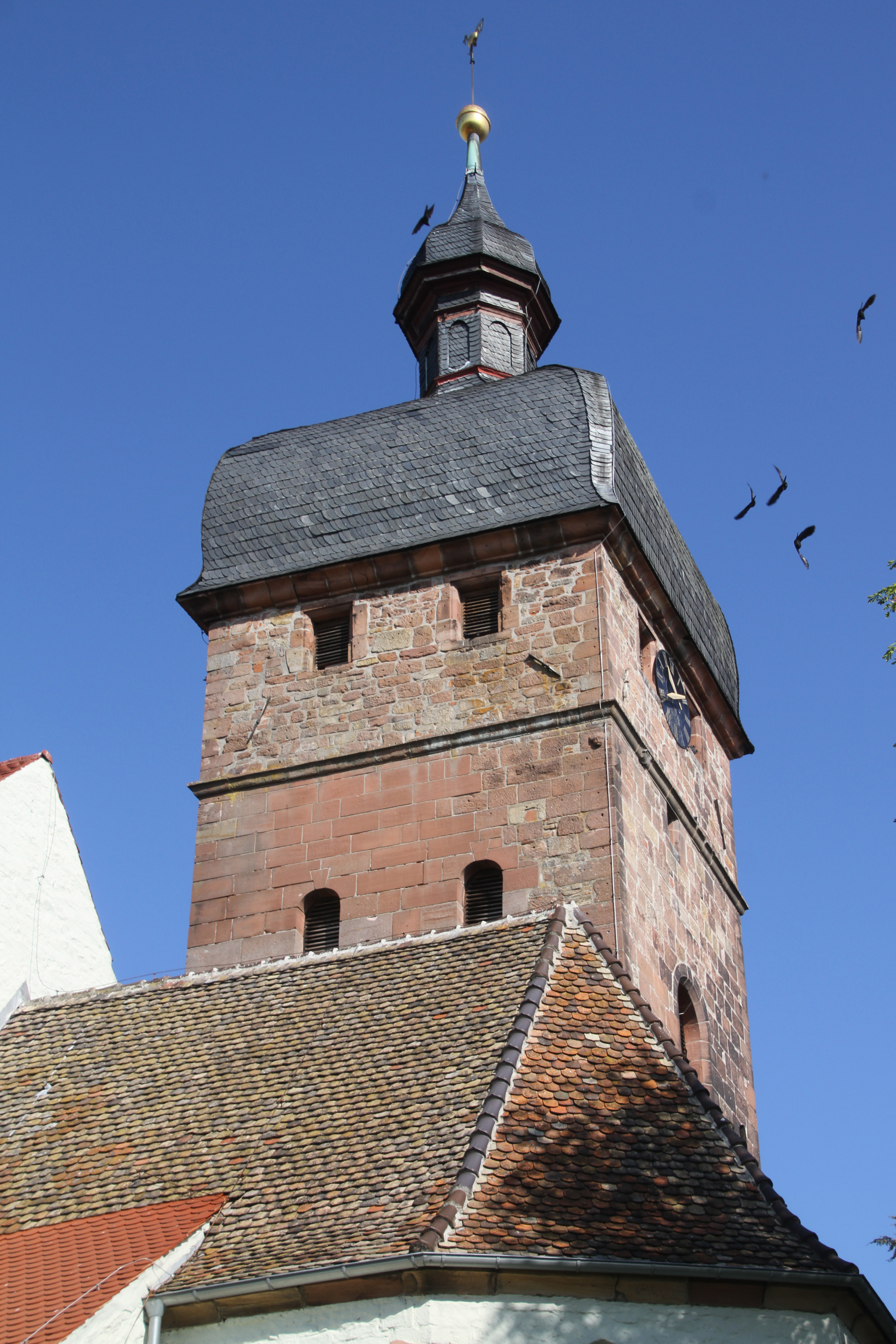
Billigheim

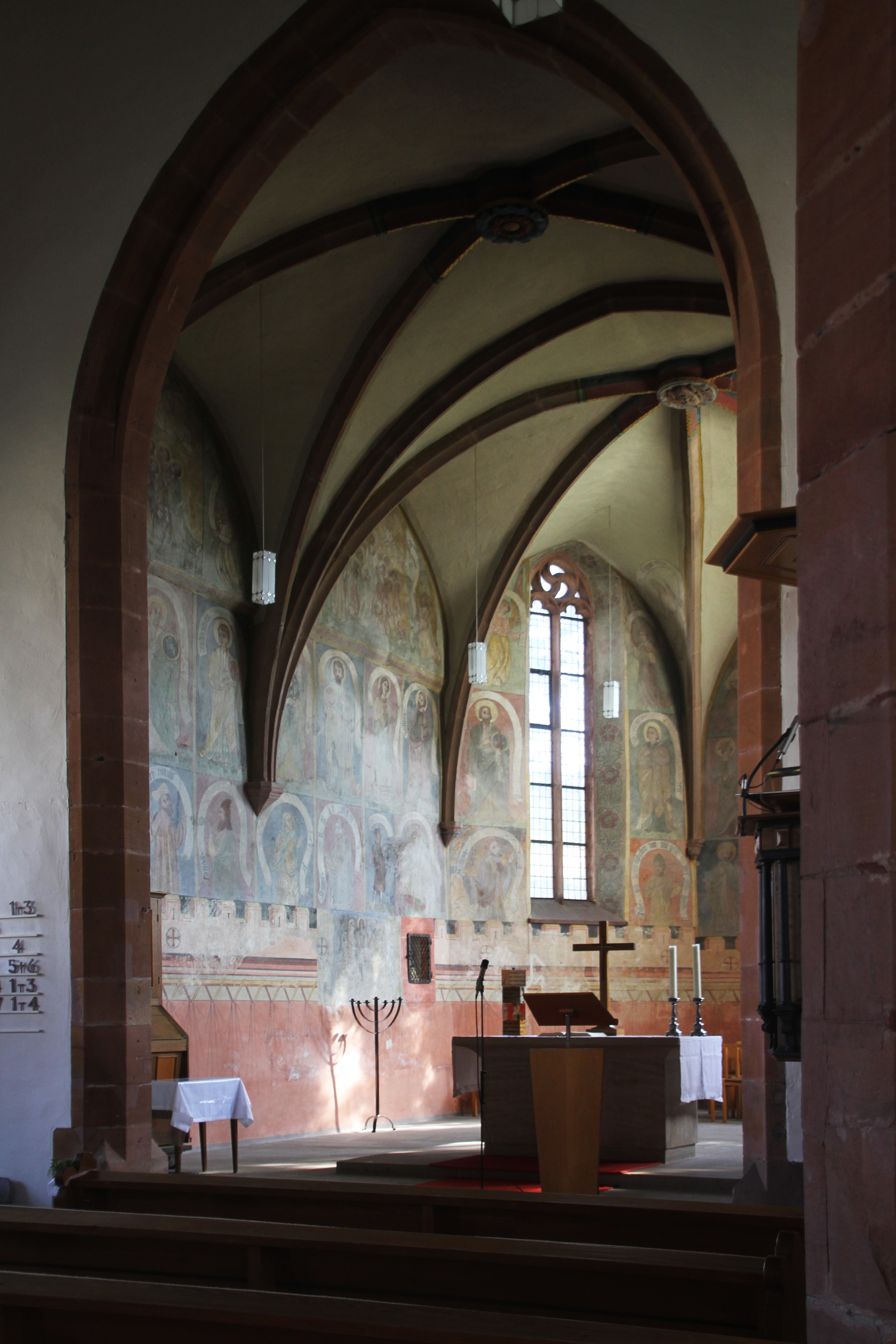
Billigheim

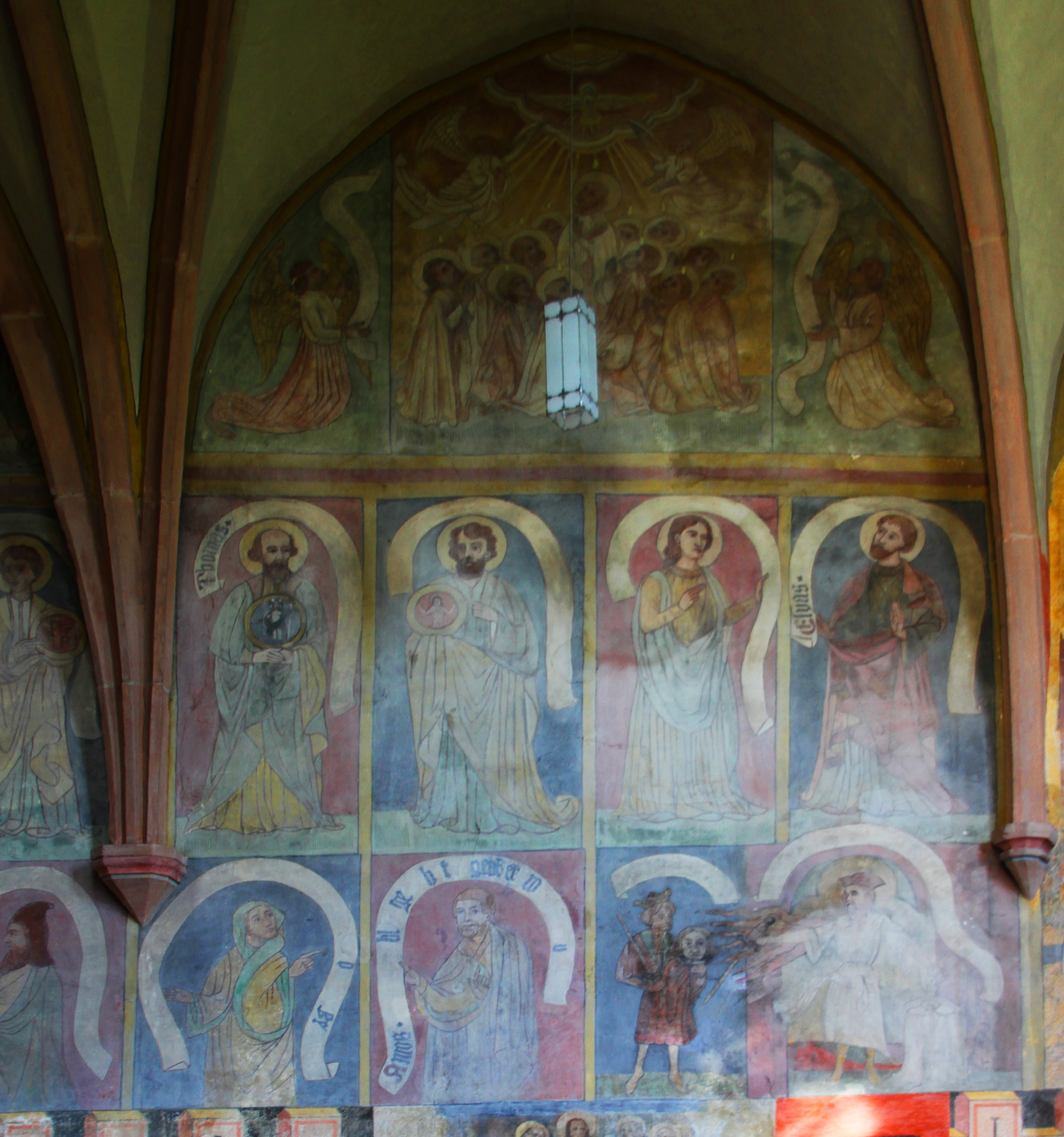
Billigheim

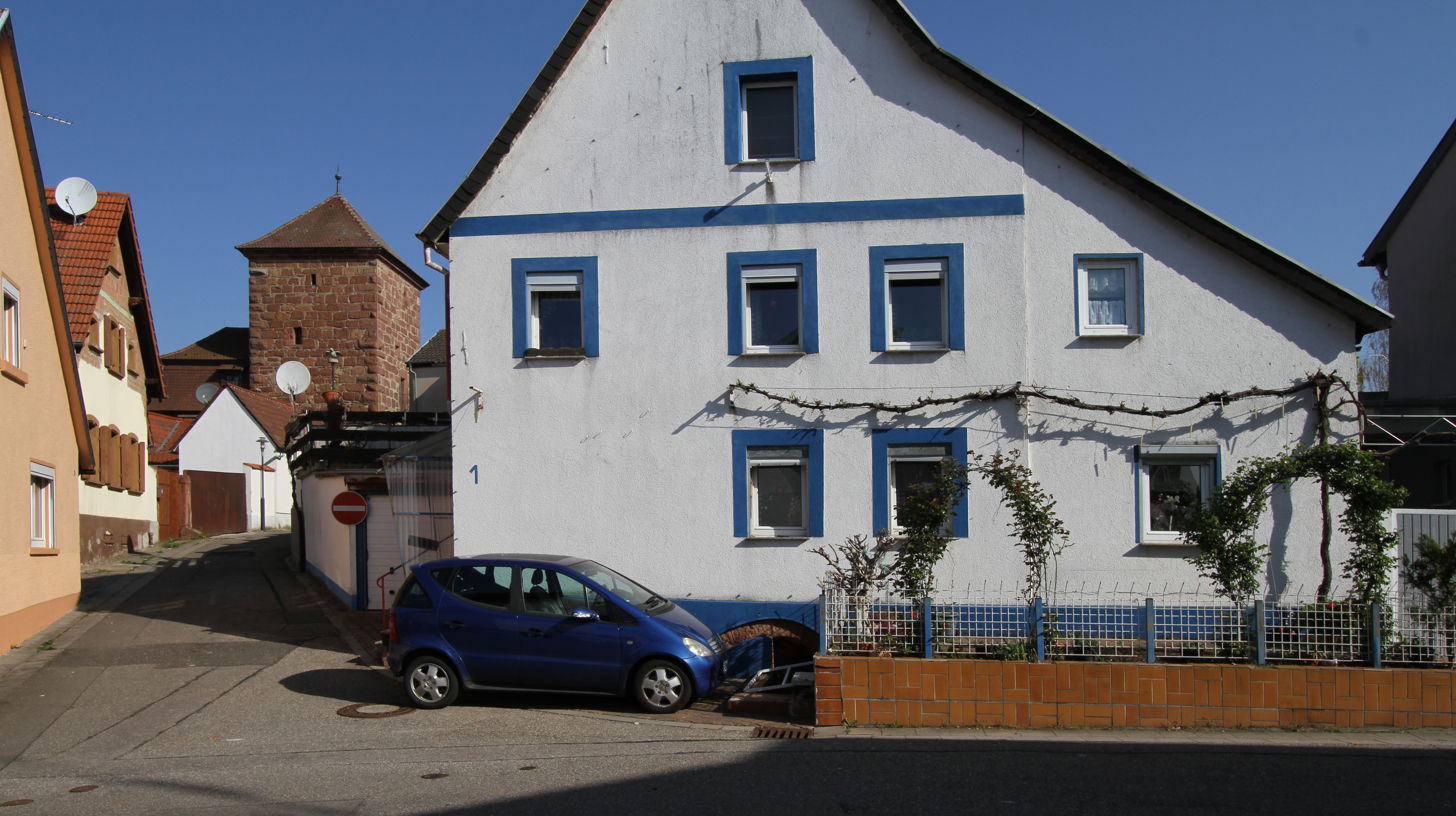
Billigheim

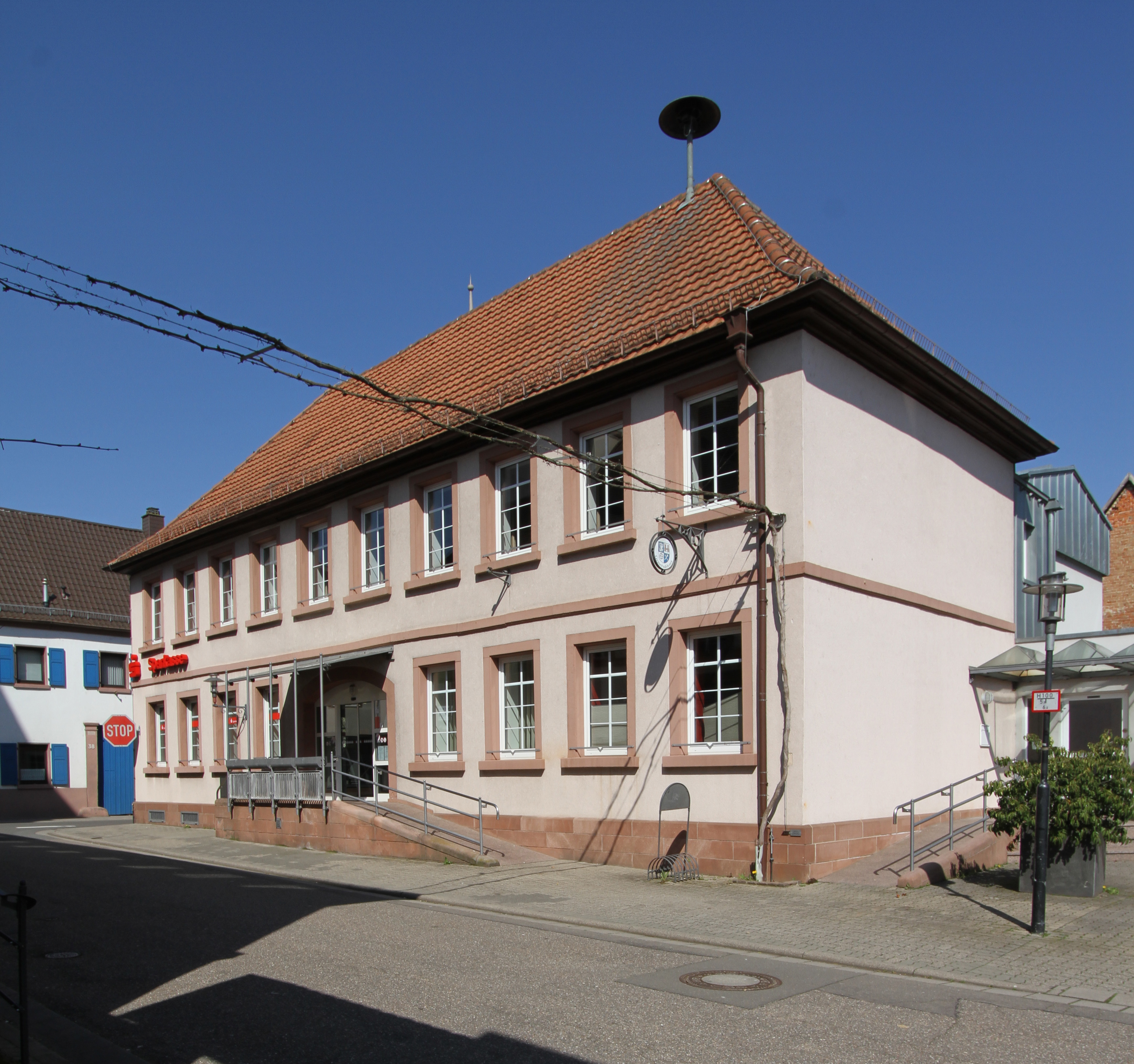
Ingenheim

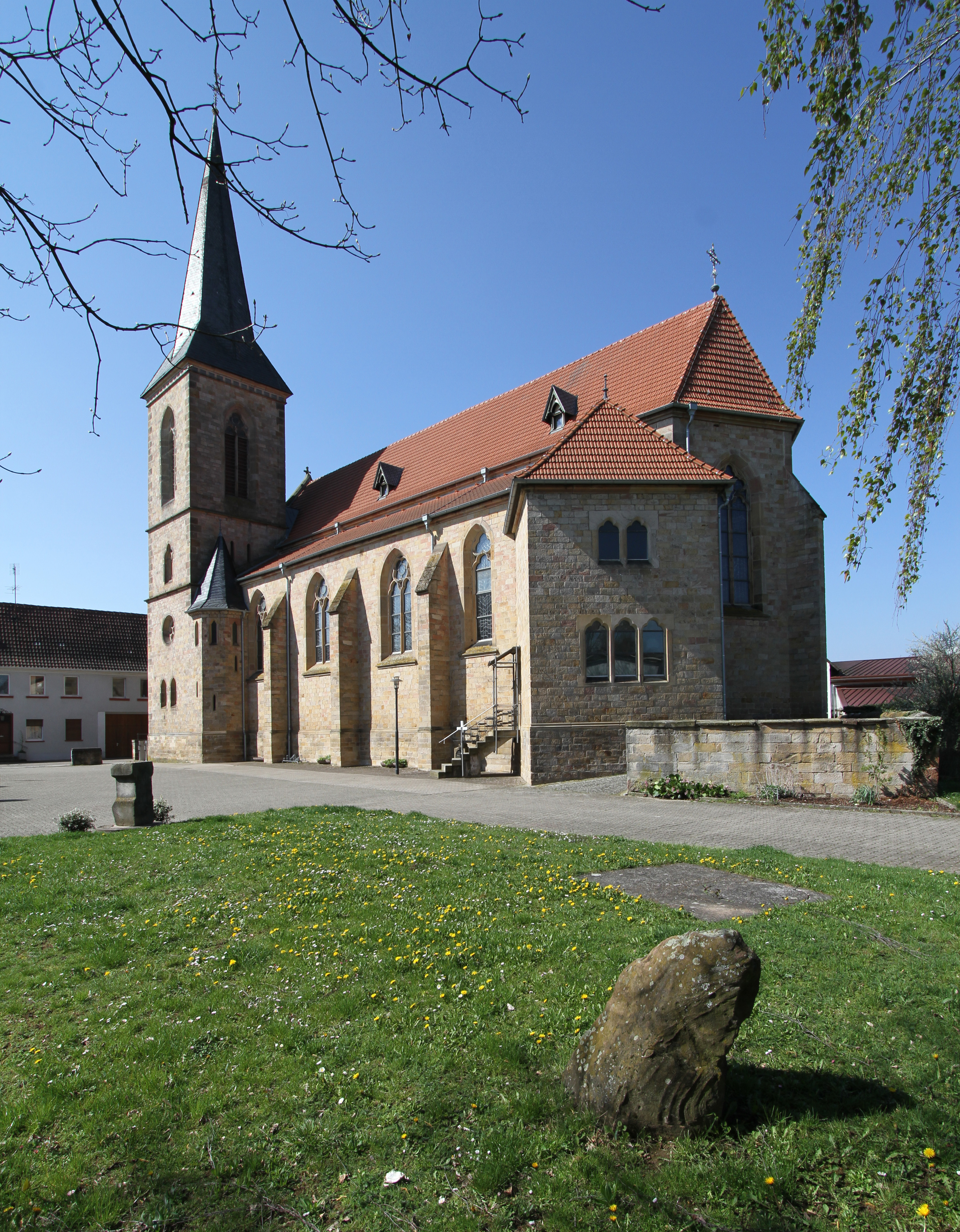
Ingenheim

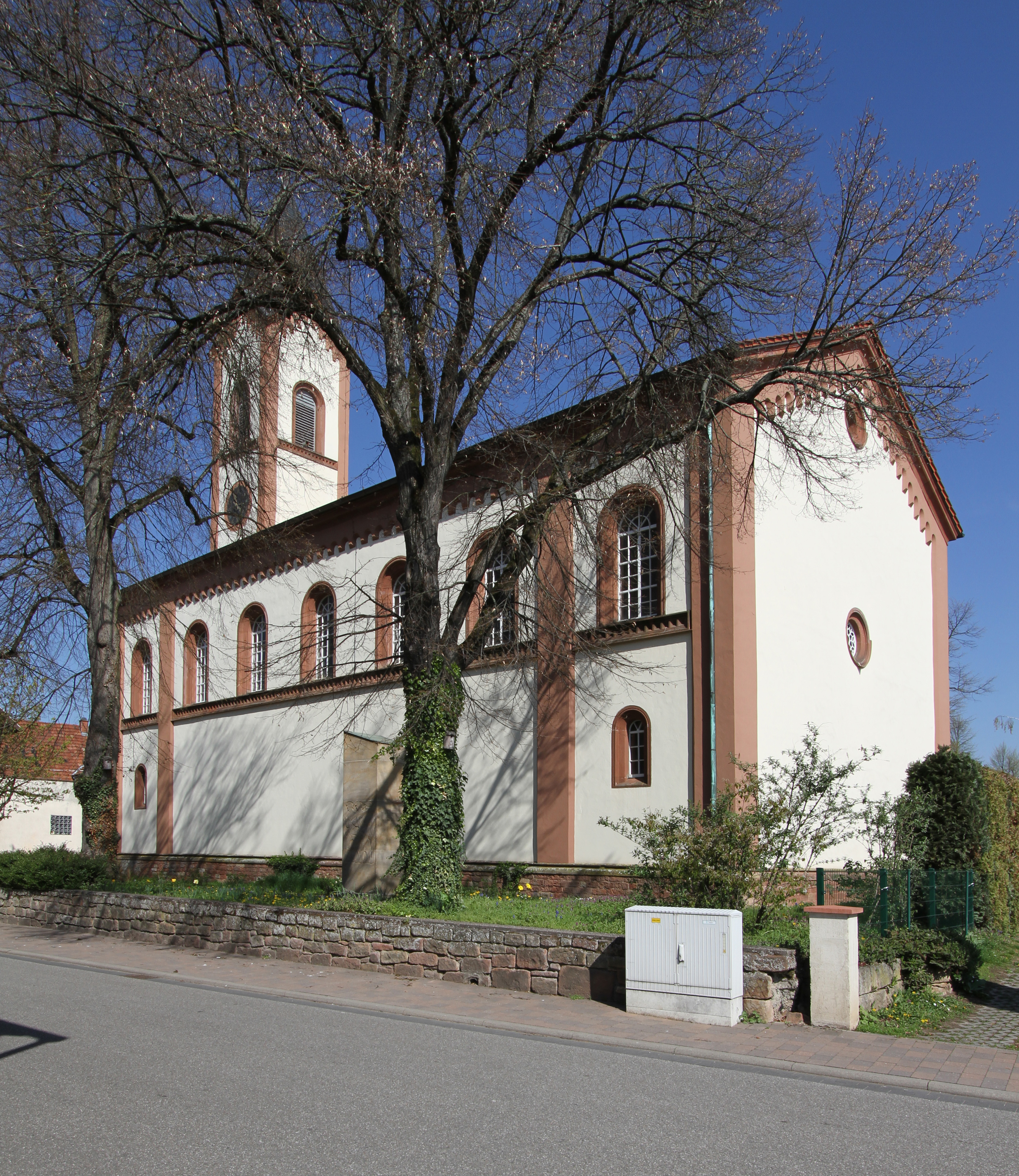
Mühlhofen
