= 1916 Utah gubernatorial election =

1916 gubernatorial election in Utah, United States

- November 7, 1916
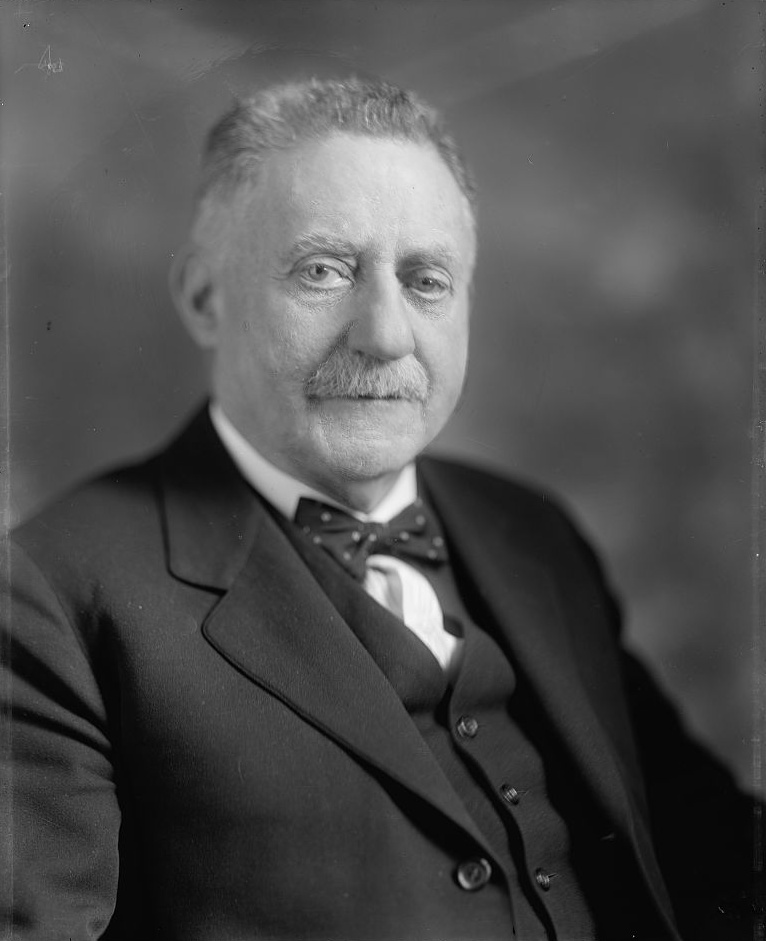

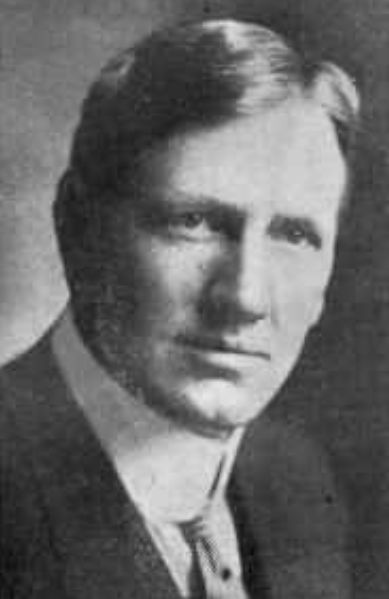
Nominee	Simon Bamberger	Nephi L. Morris
Party	Democratic	Republican
Alliance	Progressive
Popular vote	78,502	59,522
Percentage	55.12%	41.79%
- County results Bamberger: 40–50% 50–60% Morris: 40–50% 50–60%
Governor before election
William Spry
Republican
Elected Governor
Simon Bamberger
Democratic

The 1916 Utah gubernatorial election was held on November 7, 1916. Democratic nominee Simon Bamberger defeated Republican nominee Nephi L. Morris with 55.12% of the vote. It was the first time a Democrat was elected governor of the state.

== General election ==
=== Candidates ===
Major party candidates

- Simon Bamberger, Democratic & Progressive (Note: The Progressive Party had a separate ballot line in Utah in 1916 but its nominees were the Democratic nominees for all offices.)
- Nephi L. Morris, Republican

Other candidates

- F. M. McHugh, Socialist

=== Results ===
1916 Utah gubernatorial election
Party	Candidate	Votes	%	±%
Democratic	Simon Bamberger	78,502 (Note: 78,298 on the Democratic ticket and 204 on the Progressive ticket)	55.12%	+22.77%
Republican	Nephi L. Morris	59,522	41.80%	+3.63%
Socialist	F. M. McHugh	4,391	3.08%	−4.81%
Total votes		142,415	100.00%	
Majority		18,980	13.33%	
Democratic gain from Republican		Swing	+19.14%	

=== Results by county ===
County	Simon Bamberger Democratic		Nephi L. Morris Republican		F. M. McHugh Socialist		Margin		Total votes cast
County	#	%	#	%	#	%	#	%	Total votes cast
Beaver	1,178	53.57%	963	43.79%	58	2.64%	215	9.78%	2,199
Box Elder	2,612	48.38%	2,759	51.10%	28	0.52%	-147	-2.72%	5,399
Cache	4,866	53.38%	4,198	46.05%	52	0.57%	668	7.33%	9,116
Carbon	1,412	48.61%	1,339	46.09%	154	5.30%	73	2.51%	2,905
Davis	1,925 (Note: Includes 3 votes on the Progressive ticket.)	50.90%	1,836	48.55%	21	0.56%	89	2.35%	3,782
Duchesne	1,305	51.14%	843	33.03%	404	15.83%	462	18.10%	2,552
Emery	1,244	52.38%	1,049	44.17%	82	3.45%	195	8.21%	2,375
Garfield	704	51.24%	653	47.53%	17	1.24%	51	3.71%	1,374
Grand	293 (Note: Includes 2 votes on the Progressive ticket.)	53.76%	233	42.75%	19	3.49%	60	11.01%	545
Iron	1,031	49.98%	960	46.53%	72	3.49%	71	3.44%	2,063
Juab	2,105	58.17%	1,391	38.44%	123	3.40%	714	19.73%	3,619
Kane	278	42.90%	356	54.94%	14	2.16%	-78	-12.04%	648
Millard	1,574	49.42%	1,538	48.29%	73	2.29%	36	1.13%	3,185
Morgan	461	48.48%	482	50.68%	8	0.84%	-21	-2.21%	951
Piute	396	53.44%	287	38.73%	58	7.83%	109	14.71%	741
Rich	429	55.07%	350	44.93%	0	0.00%	79	10.14%	779
Salt Lake	29,200	58.62%	18,758	37.65%	1,858	3.73%	10,442	20.96%	49,816
San Juan	336	50.22%	320	47.83%	13	1.94%	16	2.39%	669
Sanpete	3,136 (Note: Includes 67 votes on the Progressive ticket.)	48.73%	3,222	50.07%	77	1.20%	-86	-1.34%	6,435
Sevier	1,851	48.48%	1,904	49.87%	63	1.65%	-53	-1.39%	3,818
Summit	1,427	48.80%	1,256	42.95%	241	8.24%	171	5.85%	2,924
Tooele	1,401	50.78%	1,254	45.45%	104	3.77%	147	5.33%	2,759
Uintah	1,340 (Note: Includes 4 votes on the Progressive ticket.)	59.29%	827	36.59%	93	4.12%	513	22.70%	2,260
Utah	7,899 (Note: Includes 6 votes on the Progressive ticket.)	57.15%	5,545	40.12%	377	2.73%	2,354	17.03%	13,821
Wasatch	853	49.82%	845	49.36%	14	0.82%	8	0.47%	1,712
Washington	1,185	56.51%	908	43.30%	4	0.19%	277	13.21%	2,097
Wayne	363	57.89%	255	40.67%	9	1.44%	108	17.22%	627
Weber	7,698 (Note: Includes 120 votes on the Progressive ticket.)	58.12%	5,191	39.20%	355	2.68%	2,507	18.93%	13,244
Total	78,502	55.12%	59,522	41.79%	4,391	3.08%	18,980	13.33%	142,415

==== Counties that flipped from Republican to Democratic ====
- Carbon
- Davis
- Emery
- Garfield
- Grand
- Iron
- Juab
- Piute
- Rich
- Salt Lake
- Summit
- Tooele
- Wasatch
- Wayne
- Weber

==== Counties that flipped from Progressive to Democratic ====
- Uintah
