= Congregation Sharey Tzedek Synagogue =

Historic building in Utah, United States

- Hebrew: שערי צדק
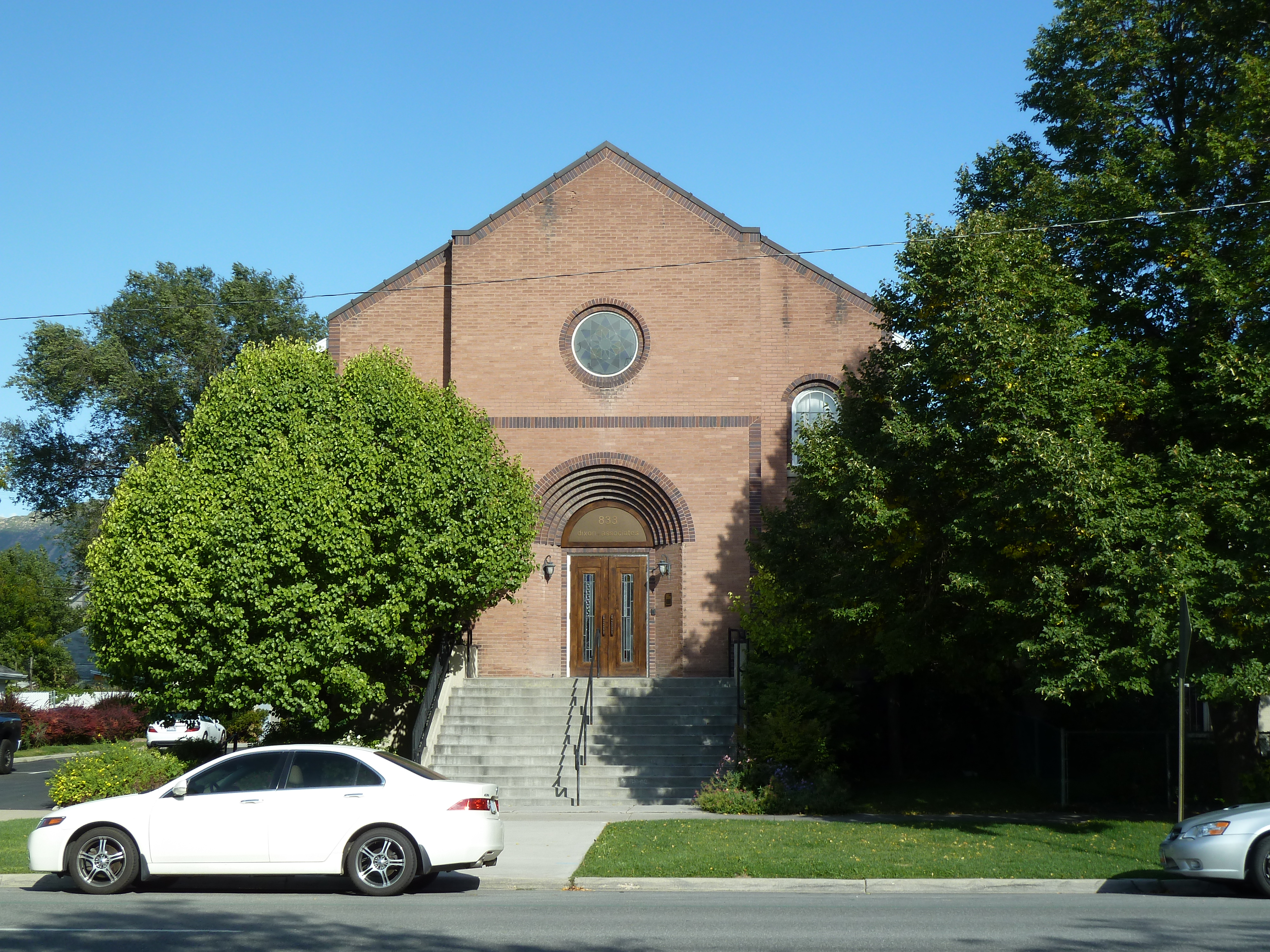
- The former synagogue, now veterans' centre, in 2014

- Location in Utah

Religion
- Affiliation: Orthodox Judaism (former)
- Ecclesiastical or organizational status: Synagogue (1916–c. 1930s); Veterans' centre (since 1948)
- Ownership: Veterans of Foreign Wars
- Status: Closed (as a synagogue); Repurposed

Location
- Location: 833 South 200 East, Salt Lake City, Utah
- Country: United States
- Interactive map of Congregation Sharey Tzedek Synagogue
- Coordinates: 40°45′4″N 111°53′3″W

Architecture
- Type: Synagogue architecture
- Style: Romanesque Revival
- General contractor: John E. Anderson
- Established: 1916 (as a congregation)
- Completed: 1920
- Congregation Sharey Tzedek Synagogue
- U.S. National Register of Historic Places
- Area: 0.2 acres (0.081 ha)
- MPS: Jewish Synagogue TR
- NRHP reference No.: 85001396
- Added to NRHP: June 27, 1985

Congregation Sharey Tzedek Synagogue (Hebrew: שערי צדק) is a historic former Orthodox Jewish synagogue, now war veterans' centre, located at 833 South 200 East in Salt Lake City, Utah, in the United States.

== History ==
A group of mostly of Yiddish-speaking immigrants from Russia and elsewhere in Eastern Europe split off from Congregation Montefiore in 1916 to form Congregation Sharey Tzedek, Utah's third Jewish congregation. The group raised $33,200 to buy the land and build a synagogue. The building was built by general contractor John E. Anderson, and it was completed in 1920. Utah Governor Simon Bamberger spoke at the dedication on March 28, 1920. When the synagogue was built, its front had circular windows that contained colored glass with a star of David. Rabbi Joseph Strinkomsky served as the congregation's first rabbi. Services were in line with Orthodox Judaism, with different seating areas for men and women. Most of the members lived within a short walk of the synagogue, and they shopped at a kosher butcher nearby.

The congregation disbanded in the 1930s, and the building was sold to the Veterans of Foreign Wars in 1948. At the time of the building's sale, many of the original members of the congregation had died, and others were attending religious services at B'nai Israel, which followed the Reform movement, or at Congregation Montefiore, which followed Conservative practices.

The building was added to the National Register of Historic Places in 1985.

According to the Utah Historical Society, the building is significant "for its historical association with Utah's pluralistic community."
