= B'nai Israel Temple (Salt Lake City) =

Synagogue building in Salt Lake City, Utah, U.S.

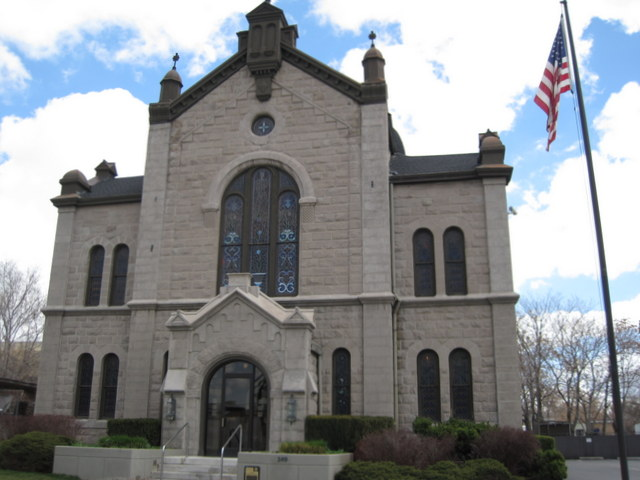
- The former synagogue, in 2010

- Location of the former synagogue in Utah

Religion
- Affiliation: Orthodox Judaism (1873–1883); Reform Judaism (1883–1973)
- Ecclesiastical or organizational status: Synagogue (1873–1973); Commercial premises (since c. 1978)
- Status: Closed (as a synagogue); Repurposed

Location
- Location: 249 South 400 East, Salt Lake City, Utah
- Country: United States
- Interactive map of B'nai Israel Temple
- Coordinates: 40°45′48″N 111°52′42″W

Architecture
- Architects: Philip Meyer, Henry Monheim
- Type: Synagogue architecture
- Style: Moorish Revival
- General contractor: Joy & Black
- Established: 1873 (as a congregation)
- Completed: 1890
- B'nai Israel Temple
- U.S. National Register of Historic Places
- Area: less than one acre
- NRHP reference No.: 78002666
- Added to NRHP: November 16, 1978

B'nai Israel Temple is a historic former Jewish congregation and synagogue, located at 249 South 400 East in Salt Lake City, Utah, in the United States. The congregation was established in 1873, and the synagogue was built in 1890.

== History ==
The synagogue was built in 1890 and added to the National Register of Historic Places in 1978. It replaced an older synagogue, which was located on the corner of 300 South and 200 West in downtown Salt Lake City. The building was originally planned to be a "facsimile in miniature" of Berlin's Fasanenstrasse Synagogue, as most of the congregation had originated in Germany, but plans were changed during construction.

The congregation observed an Orthodox style of worship until 1883, when it joined the Union of American Hebrew Congregations, the Reform movement. In 1885, the members who wanted B'nai Israel to continue to follow Orthodox tradition split off to form Congregation Montefiore (which later affiliated itself with Conservative practices). In 1973, Montefiore and B'nai Israel merged to form Congregation Kol Ami, which is a member of both the Union for Reform Judaism and the United Synagogue of Conservative Judaism.

At the time the building was listed by the National Register of Historic Places in 1978, the building had been sold and was being used a restaurant. As of 2023, the building is used by Henriksen/Butler Design Group.

== See also ==
- Congregation Sharey Tzedek Synagogue, a former congregation and synagogue in Salt Lake City
