= Congregation B'rith Sholem Synagogue =

Reform Jewish synagogue in Ogden, Utah, United States

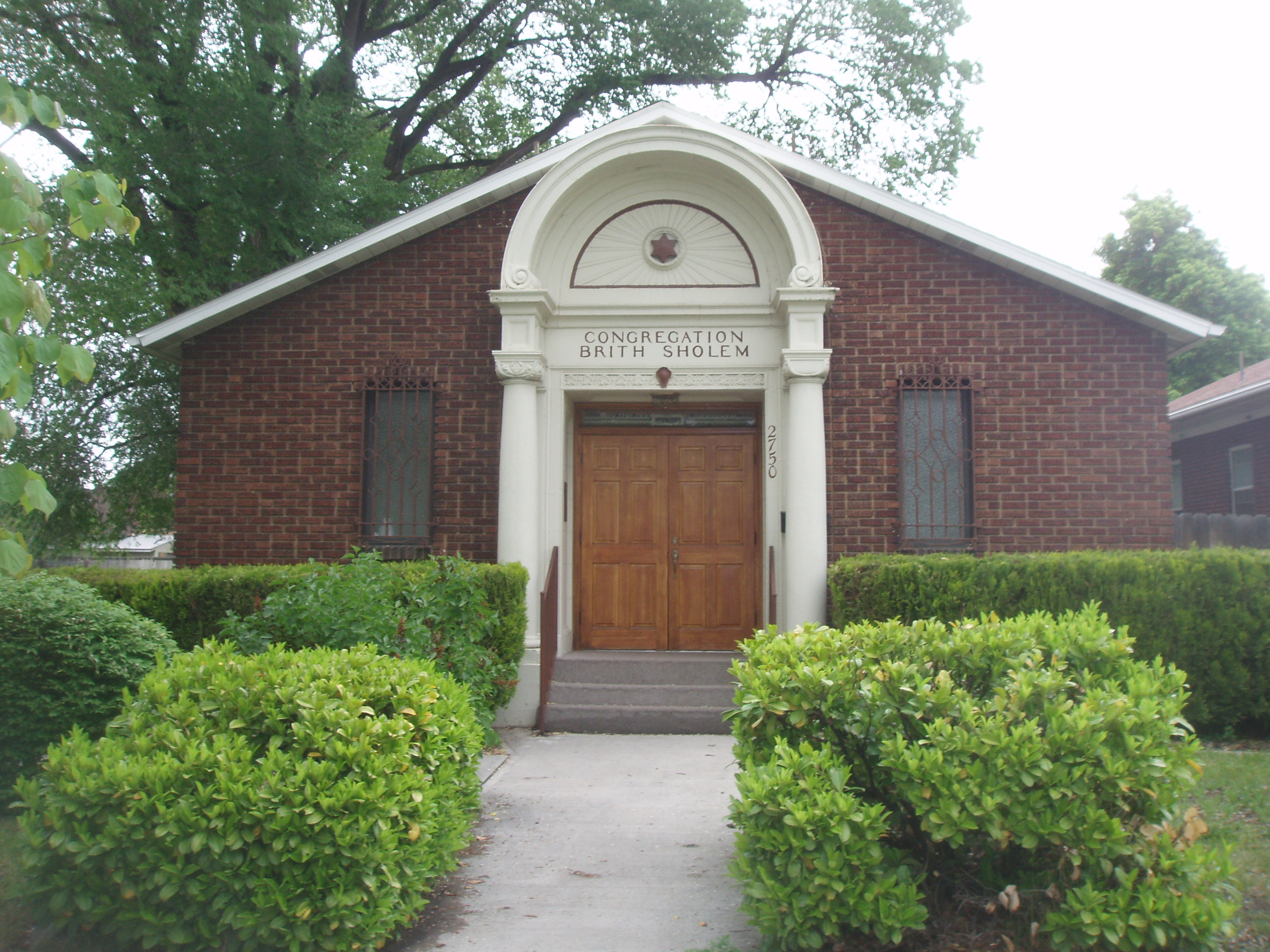
- The synagogue in 2009

- Location in Utah

Religion
- Affiliation: Reform Judaism
- Ecclesiastical or organizational status: Synagogue
- Status: Active

Location
- Location: 2750 Grant, Ogden, Utah
- Country: United States
- Interactive map of Congregation B'rith Sholem Synagogue
- Coordinates: 41°12′56″N 111°58′21″W

Architecture
- Completed: 1921

Website
- brithsholem.org
- Congregation B'rith Sholem Synagogue
- U.S. National Register of Historic Places
- Area: less than one acre
- MPS: Jewish Synagogue TR
- NRHP reference No.: 85001394
- Added to NRHP: June 27, 1985

Congregation B'rith Sholem Synagogue is a historic Reform Jewish congregation and synagogue located in Ogden, Utah, in the United States. It was built in 1921, three decades after the first Jewish residents of Ogden began meeting at Ben Oppman's Clothing Store on 25th Street. It was listed on the National Register of Historic Places on June 27, 1985.
