= Ingenheim (Billigheim-Ingenheim) =

- Ortsteil of Billigheim-Ingenheim
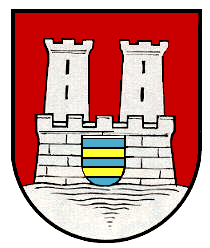
- Coat of arms
- Interactive map of Ingenheim
- Location within Germany Location within Rhineland-Palatinate
- Coordinates: 49°08′10″N 8°06′00″E
- Country: Germany
- State: Rhineland-Palatinate
- Municipality: Billigheim-Ingenheim
- Elevation: 150 m (490 ft)

Population (2011)
  - Total: 1,700
- Time zone: UTC+01:00 (CET)
  - Summer (DST): UTC+02:00 (CEST)
- Postal codes: 76831
- Dialling codes: 06349

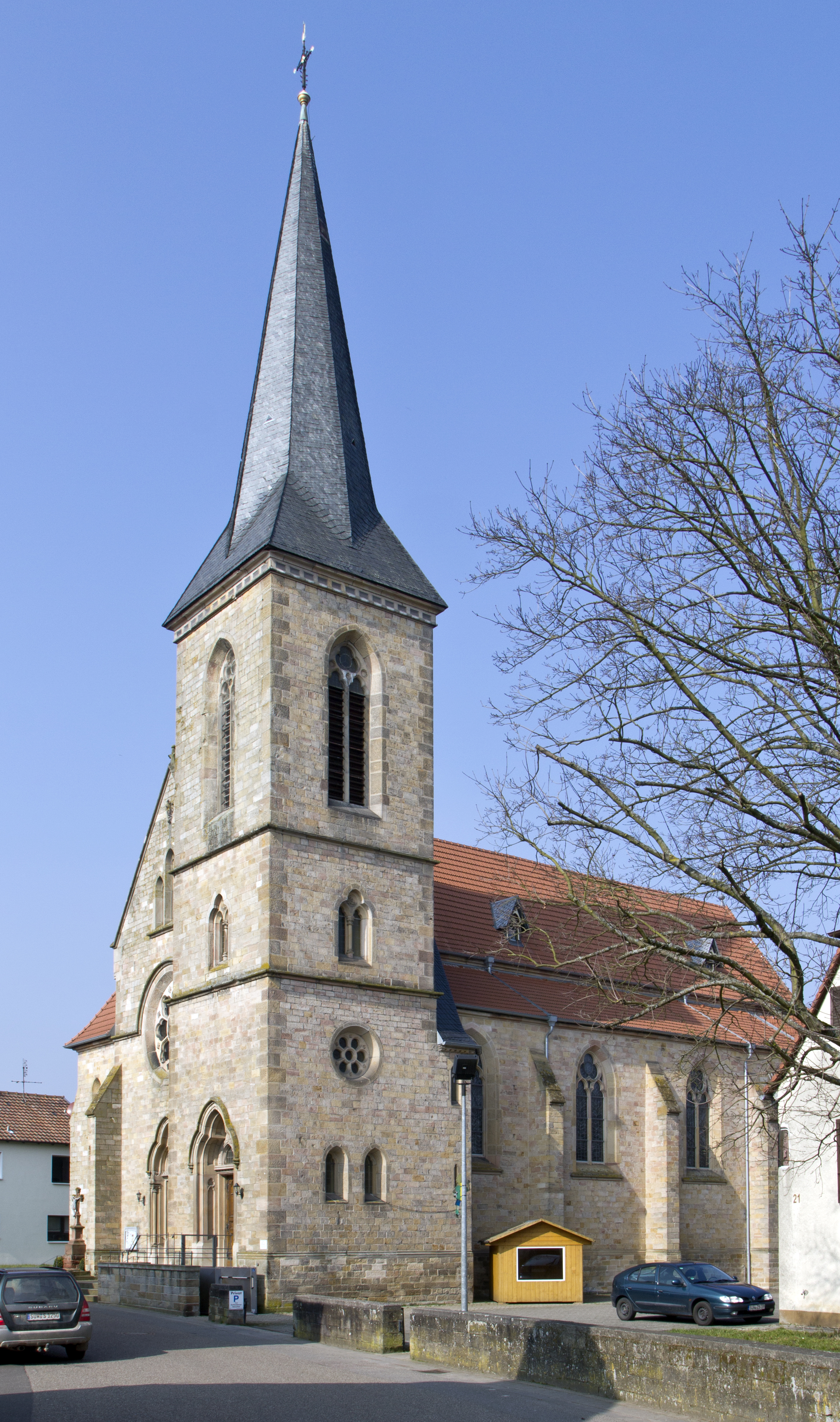
Catholic Church St. Bartholomew

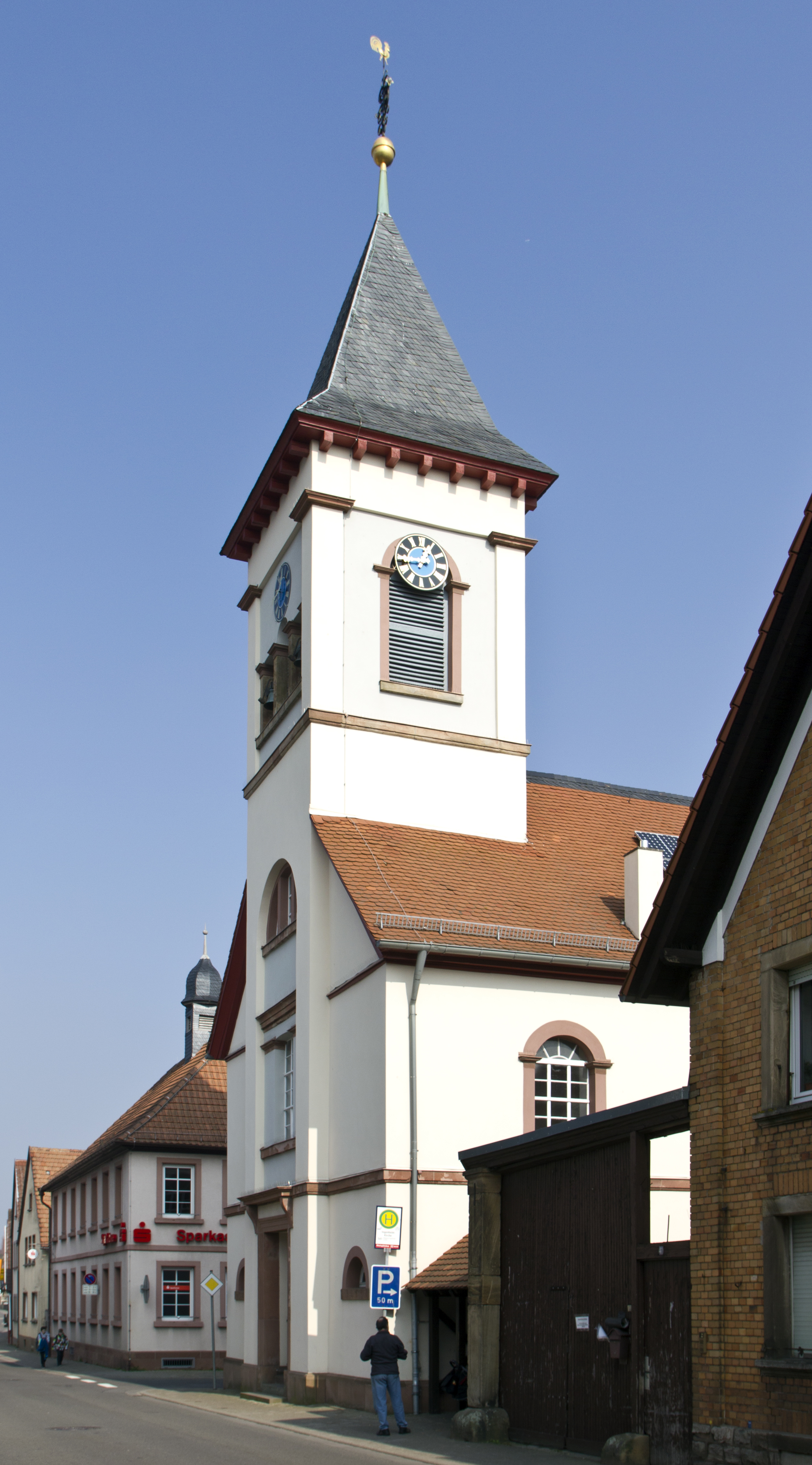
Evangelical Church

Ingenheim is a village belonging to the municipality of Billigheim-Ingenheim in the district Südliche Weinstraße (Southern Wine Route) in the Rhineland-Palatinate, Germany. Up to 1969, Ingenheim had been an autonomous borough.

== Geography ==
The village lies in the Southern Palatinate, part of it belongs to the nature preserve "Klingbachtal-Kaiserbachtal". North of the village centre runs the Klingbach. The region belongs to the Northern Rhine Rift Valley. Ingenheim lies southwest of the district of Billigheim and south of the district of Appenhofen. Federal road no. 38 connects the village to the central towns of Landau in der Pfalz and Bad Bergzabern.

Various dwelling places, like Dorfmühle, Friedrichshof, Im alten Grund, Im Peterswingert, Kehlerhof, Luisenhof and St. Georgenhof, are part of Ingenheim as well.

== History ==
Village names with the ending “-heim“ in the Upper Rhine area are attributed to the time of Frankish colonisation (5th to 7th century). Ingenheim presumably derives from the personal name Ingo. Therefore, Ingenheim was settled by a person named Ingo.

The first documented mentions of the village name dates back to 1236 and 1238, when two Burgmannen of Landeck Castle, a Konrad of Ingenheim and a Heinrich von Ingenheim, acted as witnesses to a gift of goods from the town of [Klingenmünster | [Münster]] to the Klingenmünster Abbey. The knights of Ingenheim appear quite frequently in documents of this time up to the middle of the 15th century.

The village Ingenheim was originally a fief belonging to the Klingenmünster Abbey. As such, as a property of Castle Meistersel, half of the village was pawned by Otto von Ochsenstein in 1369 to Konrad Landschad von Steinach. In 1395 Friedrich von Ochsenstein sold the other half to the Bishopric of Speyer. In the 16th century the village became the property of the barons of Gemmingen and remained in their possession up to the end of the 18th century.

In 1792, after the French Revolution (1789), the region became part of France. Under French administration, Ingenheim belonged from 1794 onwards to the Canton of Landau, which was assigned to the Arrondissement of Wissembourg in the Bas-Rhin department (department of the Lower Rhine). In 1804, 798 inhabitants boasted the village.

While the Canton of Landau, and therefore Ingenheim as well, was assigned to France during the first Treaty of Paris (1814), this part of the department of the Lower Rhine located north of the river Lauter came under the sovereign territory of [Austrian Empire | [Austria]] with the second Treaty of Paris (1815). The remaining areas of the Palatinate region, formerly belonging to the department of the Mont-Tonnerre, were given to Austria at the Congress of Vienna in June 1815. With the Treaty of Munich in April 1816, the entire Palatinate region was reassigned from the Austrian Empire to the Kingdom of Bavaria.

Under Bavarian administration, Ingenheim first remained in the Bavarian Canton of Landau. Due to territorial adjustments in 1817, Ingenheim was reclassified together with 5 additional municipalities to the Canton of Bergzabern, which was assigned to the County Commissariat Bergzabern (from 1862 known as District Administrative of Bergzabern). The municipality of Ingenheim had an autonomous administration. In 1819 and 1925, Daniel Bourquin was mayor of Ingenheim.

During the 19th century, Ingenheim was the largest Jewish community in the Palatinate. In the 1830s, a total of 1,631 inhabitants were living in Ingenheim, of which 551 were Jewish. The synagogue, which was destroyed in 1938, was built in 1831/1832. From 1869 to 1884, Ingenheim even had a Jewish mayor with Bernhard Roos (1796-1888).

According to 1928 official index of towns for the free state of Bavaria, a total of 1,315 inhabitants lived in 277 residential buildings in the rural community of Ingenheim.

531 inhabitants were Catholics, 687 were Protestants, 96 were Jews, and one was designated as "other“. The municipality covered 554 hectares. There was a Catholic and a Protestant parish, a Catholic, a Protestant, and a Jewish school as well as a post office. The train station “Ingenheim-Appenhofen“, on the route of the “Klingbachtalbahn“, was located in Ingenheim. The village mill with its six inhabitants belonged to the municipality as well.

In the course of the first territorial and administrative reform in Rhineland-Palatinate, the formerly autonomous municipality of Ingenheim, with at that time 1,436 inhabitants, was dissolved on June 7, 1969. Together with the municipalities of Appenhofen, Billigheim and Mühlhofen, the new municipality of Billigheim-Ingenheim was formed. At the same time, the district Bergzabern was dissolved and the municipality of Billigheim-Ingenheim was assigned to the new district Landau-Bad Bergzabern (renamed to Südliche Weinstraße in 1977).

== Transport ==
Between 1892 and 1967, Ingenheim was connected to the railway network by the “Klingbachtalbahn“. The corresponding train station “Ingenheim-Appenhofen“ was located in Ingenheim. The nearest train station since then is Rohrbach.
