= Julian Bamberger =

American politician

Julian Bamberger (1889–1967) was an American politician.

Julian Bamberger was born to German emigrant Simon Bamberger in Salt Lake City on 9 February 1889. Julian graduated from Princeton University in 1910, pursued postgraduate studies in electrical engineering, and returned to Utah. He became president of the Bamberger Railway Company, oversaw gold and copper mines in Nevada, and took over the Lagoon amusement park, founded by his father Simon in 1896. Julian Bamberger served in the Utah Senate from 1932 to 1936, as a Democrat. He died in Salt Lake City of a heart condition in 1967.
