= Congregation Kol Ami (Salt Lake City, Utah) =

Synagogue in Salt Lake City, Utah

- Location in Utah

Religion
- Affiliation: Judaism
- Rite: Reform Judaism; Conservative Judaism
- Ecclesiastical or organisational status: Synagogue
- Leadership: Rabbi Samuel L. Spector
- Status: Active

Location
- Location: 2425 E. Heritage Way, Salt Lake City, Utah 84109
- Country: United States
- Administration: Union for Reform Judaism; United Synagogue of Conservative Judaism
- Coordinates: 40°42′43″N 111°49′18″W

Architecture
- Established: c. 1880 (as a congregation); 1973 (merged)
- Completed: 1973

Website
- conkolami.org

Congregation Kol Ami is a synagogue located in Salt Lake City, Utah, in the United States. The synagogue serves both Reform and Conservative congregations that are respectively affiliated with the Union for Reform Judaism and the United Synagogue of Conservative Judaism.

According to the synagogue, the building serves as a place of worship for approximately 25% of the Jewish families in Utah.

== History ==
The congregation observed an Orthodox style of worship until 1883, when it joined the Union of American Hebrew Congregations, the Reform movement. In 1885, the members who wanted B'nai Israel to continue to follow Orthodox tradition split off to form their own congregation, Congregation Montefiore (which later affiliated itself with the United Synagogue of Conservative Judaism). In 1973, Conservative Montefiore and Reform B'nai Israel merged to form Kol Ami.

Salt Lake City's Jewish community dates back to approximately 1854. The present congregation is the result of a successful 1972 merger of Congregation B’nai Israel (Reform founded in 1891) and Congregation Montefiore (Conservative founded in 1899). The Utah Jewish population numbers approximately 5,000, with membership at Kol Ami at approximately 350 family units, or roughly 1/4 of the Jewish population of Utah. Being a part of the United Synagogue of Conservative Judaism and the Union for Reform Judaism gives the congregation a unique and enjoyable atmosphere to explore new ways of expressing Jewish faith.

In 1917, Simon Bamberger became the Jewish governor of the state of Utah. Louis Marcus became the first Jewish Mayor of Utah in 1932.

== Notable events ==
In July 2014, a 22-year-old Salt Lake City man was convicted and sentenced to serve five years in prison for shooting out windows at the synagogue. The man, Macon Openshaw, was also ordered to pay over $1900(US) in restitution.

In October 2018 Congregation hosted an interfaith candlelight vigil in memory of those who died in the shooting at the Tree of Life Synagogue in Pittsburgh, Pennsylvania, on Saturday, October 27.

== Clergy ==
=== Rabbi Samuel L. Spector ===
Rabbi Spector is the Senior Rabbi, He was born and raised in Seattle, Washington. He attended the University of California, San Diego, where he was an active brother of the Alpha Epsilon Pi fraternity. Rabbi Spector graduated with Cum Laude honors with a B.A. in Judaic Studies, a minor in Behavioral Psychology, and was elected Phi Beta Kappa. He received his master's degree in Hebrew Letters and Rabbinic Ordination from the Hebrew Union College-Jewish Institute of Religion in Los Angeles.

While in rabbinical school, Rabbi Spector served for three years as the student rabbi of Congregation Etz Chaim in Merced, California; a member of the Chaplain Candidate Program for the United States Navy; and as a chaplain intern at Los Angeles County/USC General Hospital. While in school, he led several teen trips to Israel and Eastern Europe.

Prior to coming to Congregation Kol Ami, Rabbi Spector served as the Associate Rabbi of Temple Judea in Tarzana, California, where he became recognized for his creation of young professional programming. While there, Rabbi Spector was an Edah Fellow through the Los Angeles Jewish Federation and the President of the West San Fernando Rabbinic Task Force and a delegate to the Jewish Welfare Board. He is currently a member of the Central Conference of American Rabbis.

=== Frederick L. Wenger ===
Rabbi Frederick L. Wenger is the Rabbi Emeritus. He was born in Davenport, Iowa and raised in Rock Island, Illinois. He received his AB from the University of Chicago and his Rabbinic ordination from the Hebrew Union College-Jewish Institute of Religion, Cincinnati, Ohio. He served as a U.S. Army Chaplain in Fort Jackson, South Carolina and Vietnam. After his discharge from military service, Rabbi Wenger served as Assistant Rabbi at Congregation Emanuel-El B'ne Jeshurun, Milwaukee, Wisconsin.

After leaving Milwaukee, Rabbi Wenger and his wife studied in Israel for a year, after which Rabbi Wenger accepted the position of Rabbi at B'nai Shalom Congregation, Huntington, West Virginia. Over his extended career, Rabbi Wenger progressed to pulpits of increasing responsibility at Temple Beth-El, Overland Park, Kansas and Temple B'nai Israel, Skokie, Illinois.

The Wenger family moved to Salt Lake City in 1987 after Rabbi Wenger assumed the pulpit at Congregation Kol Ami. Rabbi Wenger has served on the boards of major organizations in the Jewish and general communities. In 1994, he was awarded an honorary doctorate from the Hebrew Union College-Jewish Institute of Religion. Rabbi Wenger retired from Congregation Kol Ami in 2003.

Following his retirement, Rabbi Wenger and his wife volunteered four months a year for several years at Hadassah Neurim and Nahalal Youth Villages in Israel. He also served as Rabbi-in-Residence at Congregation Beth Sholom, Anchorage, Alaska from 2004 to 2007. Rabbi Wenger has been teaching World Religions at Westminster College in Salt Lake City since 2001. He also served on the faculties of Marshall University, Huntington, West Virginia and Brigham Young University, Provo, Utah.

Rabbi Wenger z"l passed away on November 6, 2024, survived by his wife, children, brother and sister and 6 grandchildren

=== Laurence Loeb ===
Cantor Loeb is the Cantor Emeritus. He has been in the Cantorate for over 50 years. He was the youngest graduate ever from the Cantor's Institute at the Jewish Theological Seminary in New York. He continued graduate study at the Jewish Theological Seminary in Ethnomusicology and received a Ph.D. in anthropology from Columbia University.

Using his background in Jewish music and anthropology, he studied the music and culture of the Jews of Iran. Based on that study, he published a book titled, 'Outcaste: The Jews of Southern Iran'. His subsequent anthropological research involved a Yemenite Community which now resides in Israel.

After serving as Cantor for ten years on the East Coast, Loeb moved to Utah, with his family over 40 years ago. Cantor Loeb retired from the University of Utah where he was a faculty member of the anthropology department and served as department chairman for six years.

== Notable people ==
- Simon Bamberger - became the Jewish governor of the state of Utah in 1917
- Louis Marcus (mayor) - became the first Jewish Mayor of Utah in 1932
- Maurice Abravanel - conductor of the Utah Symphony for over 30 years, National Medal of Arts, Tony Award
- Samuel Newhouse - entrepreneur and mining magnate
- Simon Ramo - engineer, businessman, and author
- David Litvack - Minority Leader in the Utah house
- Patrice Arent - Member of Utah House 1997–2002, 2010-2020 and Senate 2002–2006
- Paul W. Draper - Anthropologist, Magician, Speaker
- Robert Alan Goldberg - American Historian and Professor
- Jacqueline Osherow - an American poet, and Distinguished Professor at the University of Utah
