= Simon Bamberger =

American politician (1845–1926)

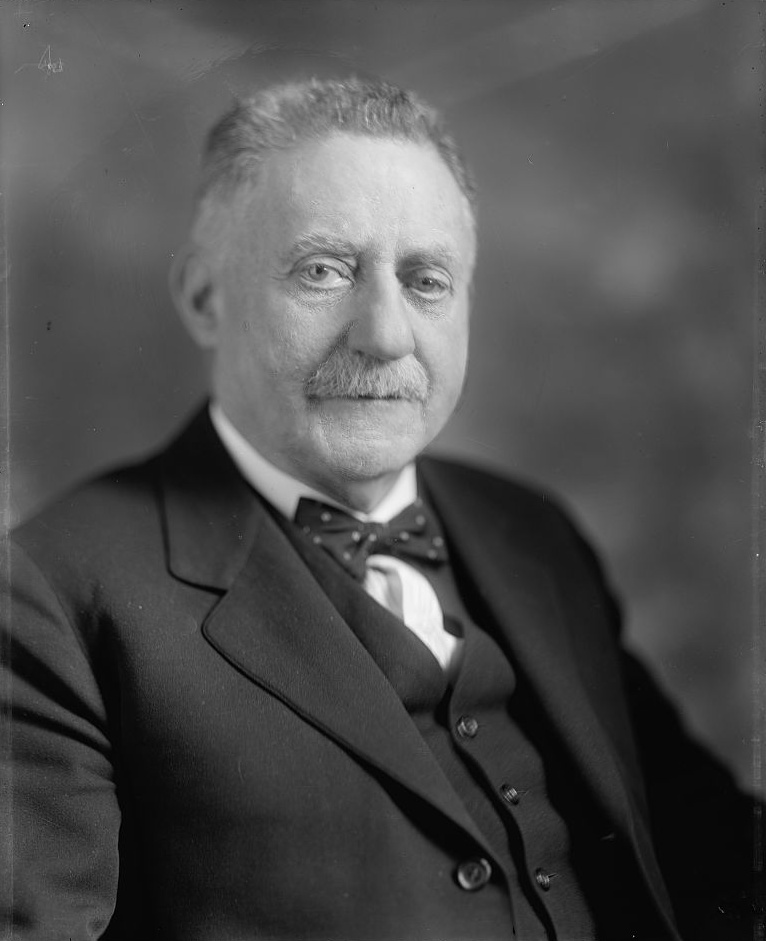
- Bamberger, 1905–1926

4th Governor of Utah
- In office January 1, 1917 – January 3, 1921
- Preceded by: William Spry
- Succeeded by: Charles R. Mabey

Personal details
- Born: February 27, 1845 Darmstadt-Eberstadt, Hesse-Darmstadt
- Died: October 6, 1926 (aged 81) Salt Lake City, Utah, U.S.
- Party: Democratic
- Spouse: Ida Maas
- Children: 4, including Julian

Simon Bamberger (February 27, 1845 – October 6, 1926) was a German-American entrepreneur and politician who served as the fourth governor of Utah (1917–1921) after it achieved statehood from territorial status in 1896. Bamberger retains the distinction of being the first non-Mormon, the first Democrat, as well as the first, and to date only, Jewish Governor of Utah. He was also the third Jew ever elected governor of any state, after Washington Bartlett of California and Moses Alexander of Idaho.

== Early years ==
Born on February 27, 1845, in Darmstadt-Eberstadt, Hesse-Darmstadt, Germany, Bamberger was the son of Emanuel Bamberger and the former Helen Fleisch. He emigrated to the United States at the age of fourteen, shortly before the American Civil War broke out. Landing in New York City, he embarked on a train to Cincinnati, Ohio. However, Bamberger missed the connection at Columbus and ended up in Indianapolis, Indiana, and, then Terre Haute, Indiana. He remained there until the Civil War ended in 1865, at which point he relocated to St. Louis, Missouri, and established a garment manufacturing company with his brother Herman. A few years later, while in Wyoming to collect a debt, Bamberger got word that the business had failed. Figuring he had nothing to lose, he struck out for Utah, which at that time was still a territory and barely settled.

Bamberger married Ida Maas in 1881. They had four children, including Julian Bamberger, who was a member of the Utah Senate from 1932 to 1936.

== Utah entrepreneur ==
Bamberger began operating a small hotel in Ogden, Utah, not far from Salt Lake City. A short time later, an outbreak of smallpox resulted in a quarantine that forced the Union Pacific Railroad to bypass the town, so Bamberger moved on to Salt Lake itself, where he operated the Delmonico Hotel with a partner. In 1872, Bamberger invested in a silver mine, the Centennial Eureka Mine in Juab County. A major vein of silver was struck two years later, making Bamberger a millionaire; for a brief time, he contemplated retiring, but soon got involved in building railroads. He opened various lines linking Salt Lake City to mining operations, but the ventures lost a substantial amount of money, and during this period also built Lagoon, a large amusement park in Farmington, Utah. Another notable venture Bamberger pursued was the establishment of a Jewish agricultural colony in Clarion, Utah. These were the years of the nascent Zionist movement, which was spearheaded by Theodor Herzl. Herzl believed that Jews, hitherto stigmatized as a rootless, wandering people, urgently needed to get in touch with the soil and develop the agricultural skills that centuries of restrictions in Europe had kept from them. It is quite possible that these ideas influenced Bamberger; however, despite Bamberger's fundraising efforts between 1913 and 1915, the community folded.

== Bamberger's Interurban Railroad ==
Bamberger constructed a railroad, the Salt Lake and Ogden, from Salt Lake City to Ogden in 1908. In 1910 it was converted to electric operation. Eventually the family name was adopted as the corporate name, and it became the Bamberger Railroad. An amusement park and lake were constructed midway between the namesake towns to attract riders and increase business, particularly during the summer months. The Bamberger had good freight business even though it directly competed with the Union Pacific Railroad. Due to the impact of the Depression coupled with the growing use of automobiles riding on new state highways, most U.S. interurbans abandoned operations prior to the start of World War II. The Bamberger, however, survived to the mid-1950s due to a good freight business. It had purchased five modern high speed Brill Company Bullet cars in 1938 to improve schedules and hold its passenger business. During WW2, it constructed new trackage to an army post where it had extensive business. The Bamberger stopped operations in 1955. Bamberger Railroad streetcar #127 is preserved at the Southern California Railway Museum.

== Political ascent ==
During all this time, Bamberger had also been getting increasingly involved with politics. He began on the local level, serving on the Salt Lake City Board of Education between 1898 and 1903. A firm believer in universal, free and public education, Bamberger at one point donated some of his own money in order to keep the public school system solvent. In 1902, he ran for the Utah State Senate as a progressively-oriented Democrat, and won re-election repeatedly. During his time in the legislature, he obtained a reputation as a witty man with a marked capability for achieving substantive results.

In 1912, however, Bamberger was defeated for re-election to the state senate. Four years later, he briefly contemplated running for the United States Senate, since popular election of senators had recently been introduced by means of the 17th Amendment to the United States Constitution in 1913. Instead, he opted to run for governor.

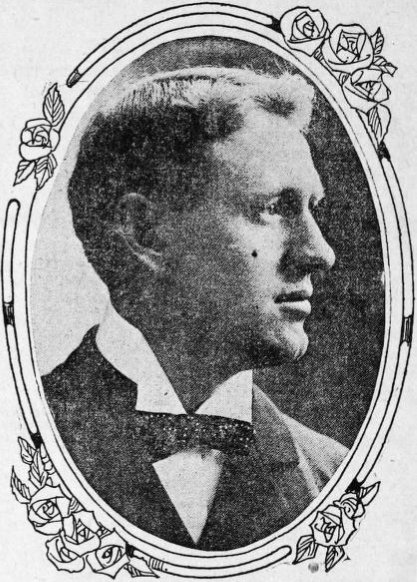
Nephi L. Morris

During the election campaign, Brigham H. Roberts, a member of The Council of the Seventy of the Church of Jesus Christ of Latter-day Saints (LDS Church), threw his support to Bamberger and called for an end to selecting candidates on the basis of church affiliation. In the primary election, Bamberger defeated Alfred W. McCune, a mine owner. In the general election, the Republican opponent, Nephi L. Morris, made Prohibition the focal point of his campaign; but Bamberger, himself a teetotaler, won easily after pledging unequivocally that he would sign a Prohibition bill.

== A progressive governor ==
Bamberger's governorship, despite lasting only a single term, was marked by a record of legislative achievement impressive by any standards. Having inherited a large budget deficit, he immediately called for an audit of all state agencies and recovered a million dollars in misallocated funds, a considerable sum at the time. Fortunate enough to have the cooperation of a Democratic majority in the legislature, Bamberger embarked on an ambitious reform agenda. The touchstones of Progressivism included regulation of industry in the public interest, women's suffrage, restrictions on child labor and the length of the workday, public education—as well as Prohibition, which in those days was inextricably linked with the women's movement.

Accordingly, under Bamberger's leadership, the legislature passed a wide variety of legislation: a Corrupt Practices Act, to control cronyism and kickbacks from utility companies to public officials, and a Labor Organization Act, acknowledging labor's right to unionize (the Federal Government did not enact such legislation until it passed the Wagner Act of 1935). Bamberger's administration was at the vanguard of modern legislation in other ways as well: in addition to fulfilling his pledge to sign a statewide Prohibition bill before the 18th Amendment was ratified nationwide, he brought Utah to the forefront of securities regulation. He pushed through legislation that prefigured some of the most significant, far-reaching 20th-century reforms in the United States. By establishing a commission to register and regulate securities in Utah, Bamberger's administration was nearly fifteen years ahead of the United States Government, which enacted such laws—the Glass–Steagall Act of 1932, the Banking Act of 1933, the Securities Act of 1933 and the Securities Exchange Act of 1934—only when the exigency of the Great Depression forced it to do so. Bamberger, on the other hand, saw the need for such regulation as a general principle. He also signed laws establishing Workers' Compensation and a state industrial commission to administer it, compulsory high school attendance, and a mine tax that actually contravened his own financial interest. He urged bond passages to improve the state's road network, and convened a special session of the Legislature to ratify the 19th Amendment to the United States Constitution, which passed in 1920 guaranteeing national women's suffrage, a right which Utah women had been granted by unanimous vote of the territorial legislature in 1869 and in the Utah State Constitution in 1895.

Other reforms instituted by Bamberger included the creation of a public health department and a public utilities commission to regulate the price of gas and electricity; a modified line-item veto to assist the governor in curbing pork barrel politics; popular election of judges on a nonpartisan basis; a longer school year; and a water rights commission to supervise water usage in residential development of hitherto rural areas, an especially crucial issue in any Western state.

== Last years ==
All of this was accomplished in a single four-year term, for Bamberger, already 75, declined to run for reelection. He left office in 1921 and returned to managing his business interests. He died on October 6, 1926, and was buried at B'nai Israel Cemetery, Salt Lake City.

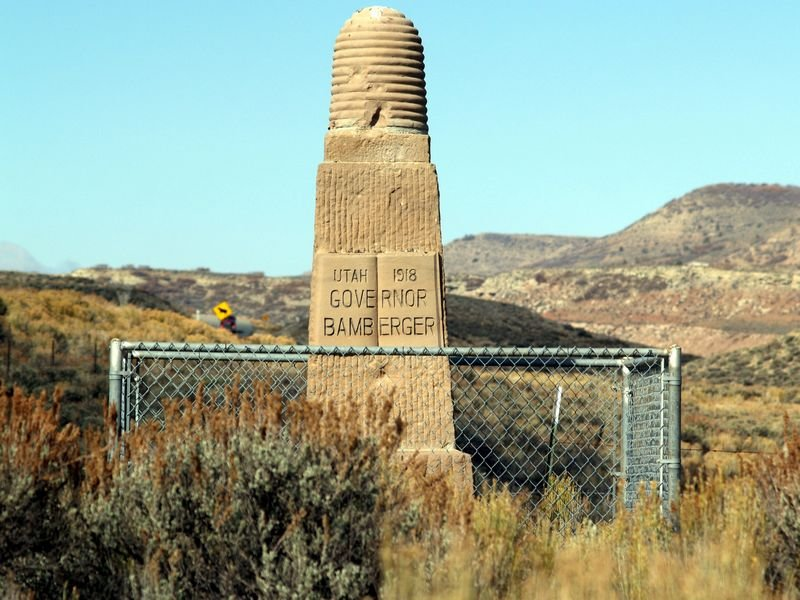
Bamberger Monument on Highway 191, north of Helper, Utah, 2007

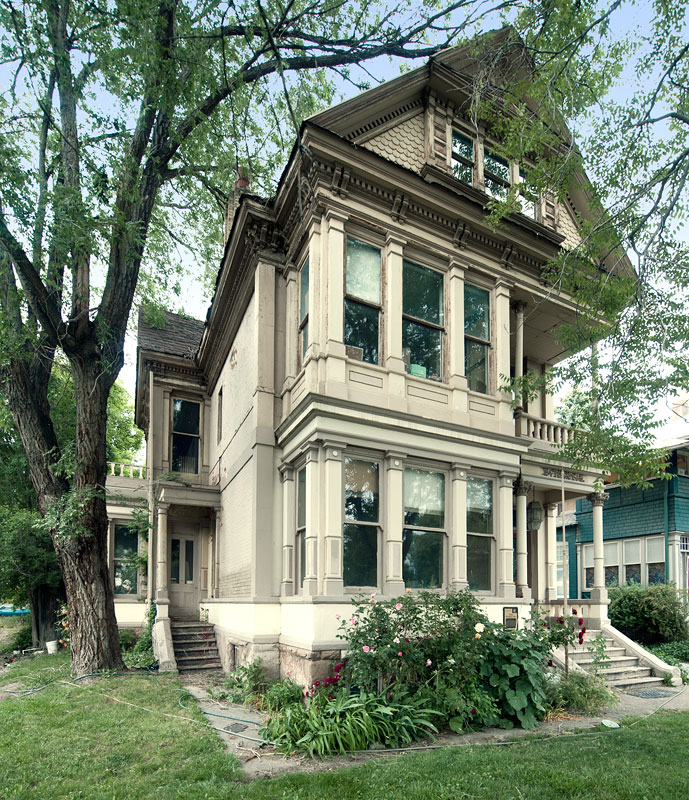
Simon Bamberger House, Salt Lake City

== See also ==
- Simon Bamberger House, listed on the National Register of Historic Places
- List of United States governors born outside the United States

== Notes ==
Party political offices
Preceded by John Tolton	Democratic nominee for Governor of Utah; 1916	Succeeded by Thomas N. Taylor
Political offices
Preceded by William Spry	Governor of Utah; 1917–1921	Succeeded by Charles R. Mabey
