= Congregation Ahavas Achim Anshi Austria =

Historic former synagogue in Rochester, New York, United States

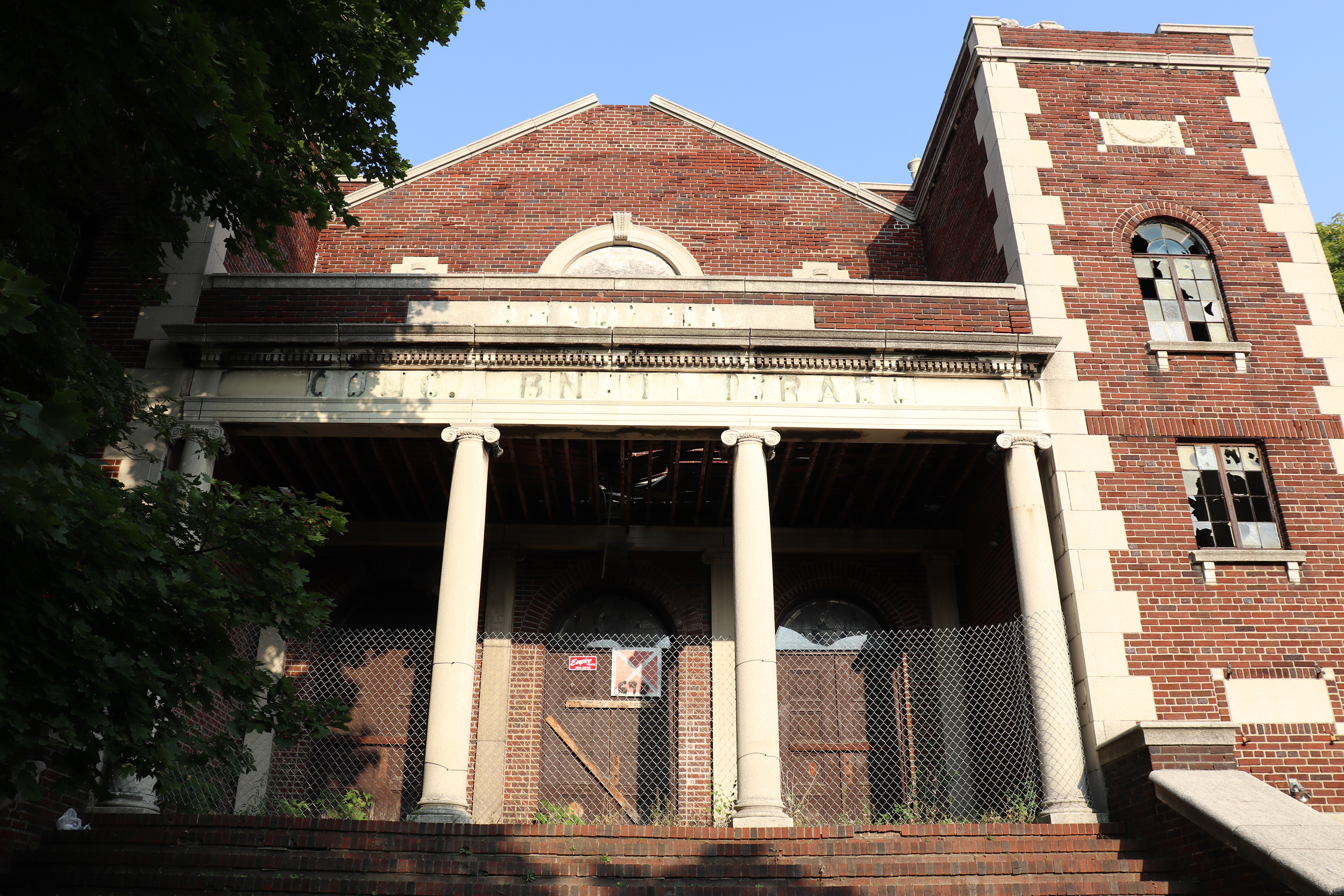

- Location in New York

Religion
- Affiliation: Orthodox Judaism (former)
- Ecclesiastical or organizational status: Synagogue (1928–2004)
- Status: Abandoned

Location
- Location: 692 Joseph Avenue, Rochester, New York
- Interactive map of Congregation Ahavas Achim Anshi Austria
- Coordinates: 43°10′38″N 77°36′34″W

Architecture
- Architect: Louis H. Friedman
- Type: Synagogue architecture
- Style: Georgian Revival
- Established: 1921 (as a congregation)
- Completed: 1928
- Materials: Brick
- Congregation Ahavas Achim Anshi Austria
- U.S. National Register of Historic Places
- Area: Less than 1 acre
- NRHP reference No.: 15000775
- Added to NRHP: November 9, 2015

Congregation Ahavas Achim Anshi Austria, also known as Congregation B'Nai Israel, is a historic former Orthodox Jewish congregation and synagogue, located in Rochester, Monroe County, New York, in the United States.

The synagogue was built in 1928, and is a two-story, Georgian Revival style brick building with decorative cast stone classical details. It is five-bays wide with the end bays being square towers and a recessed triangular parapet is between the two towers. The front façade features a portico with four Ionic order round columns. The building was used as a synagogue until 2004.

It was listed on the National Register of Historic Places in 2015.

== Gallery ==
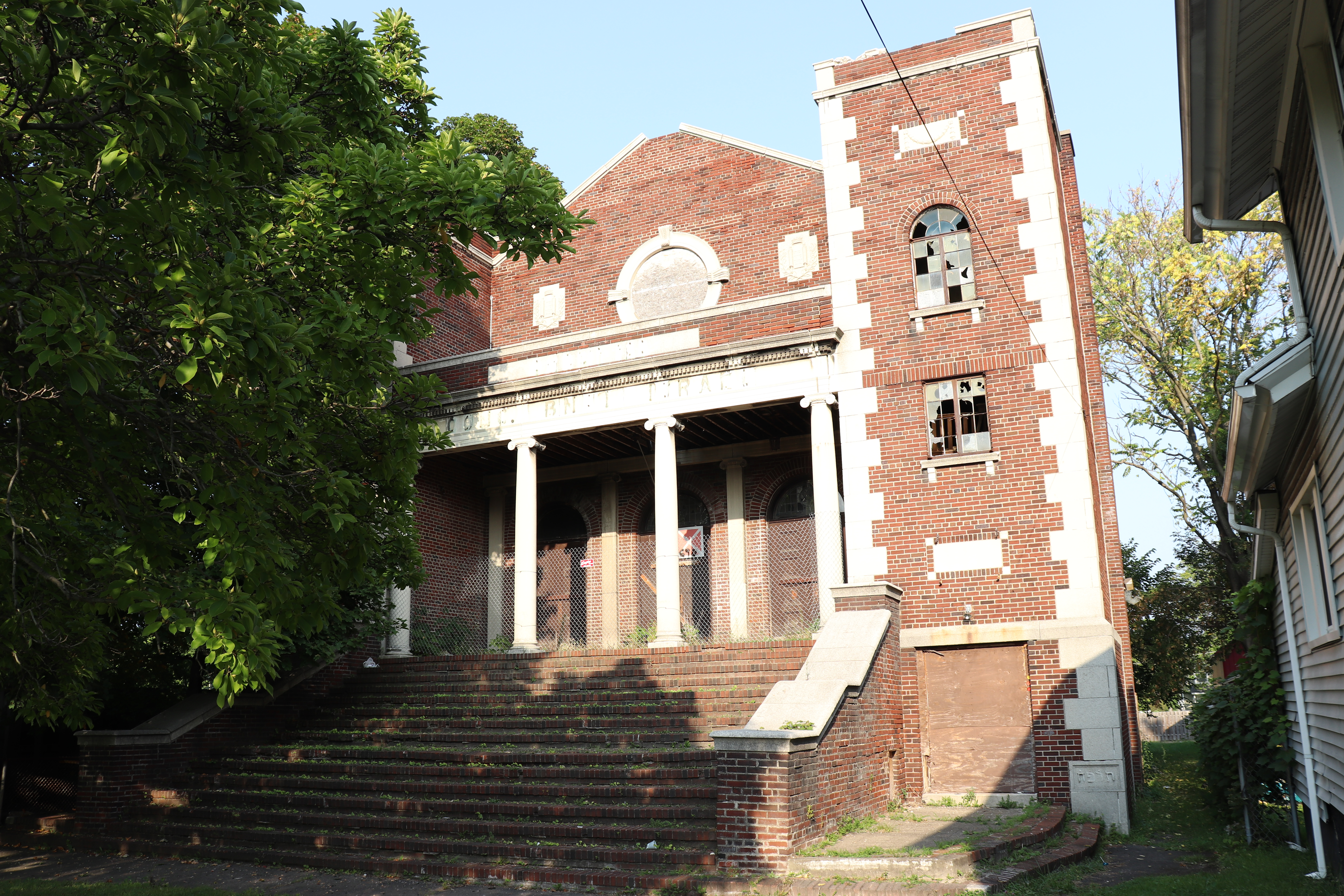
Front oblique

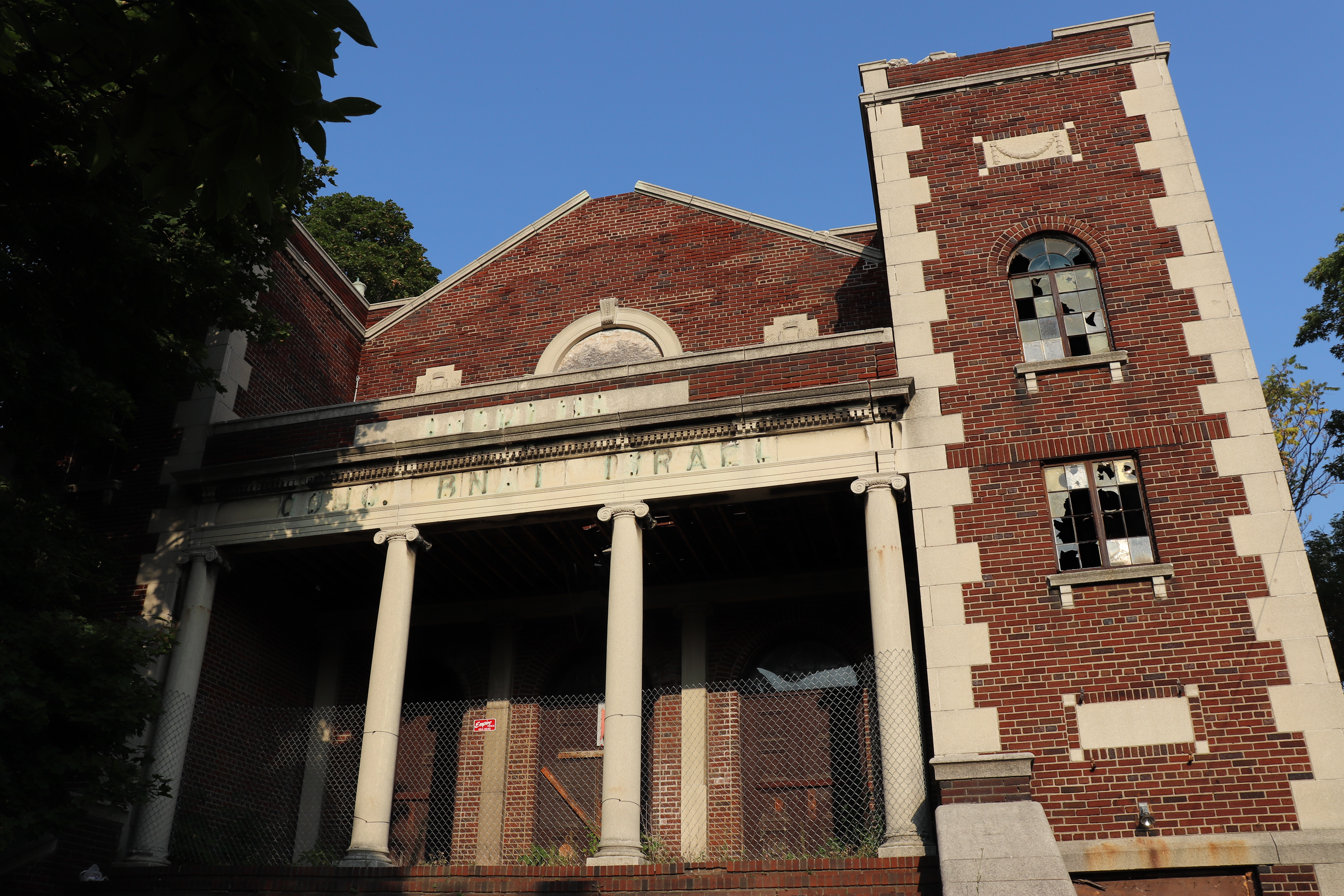
Front oblique

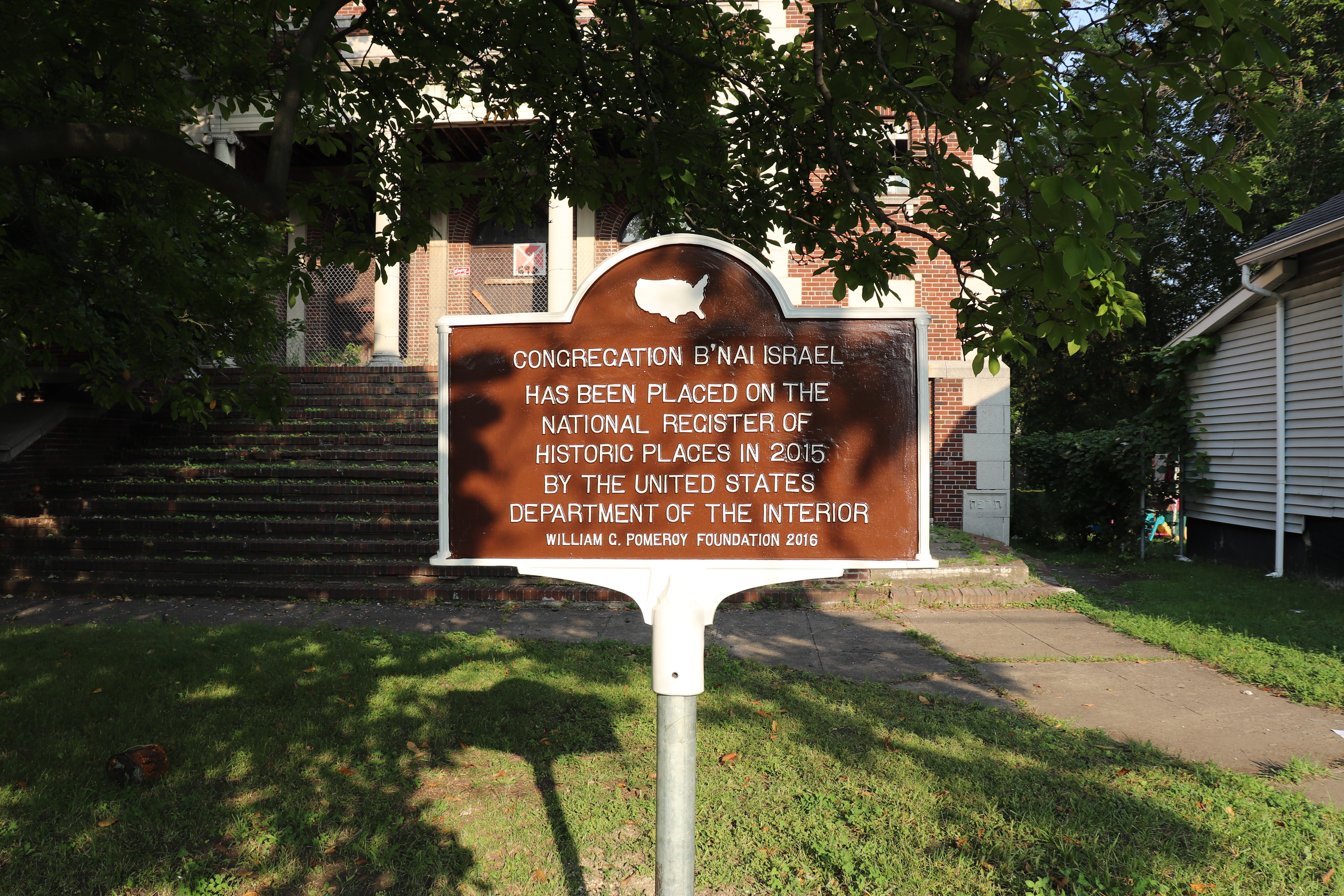
Historic marker

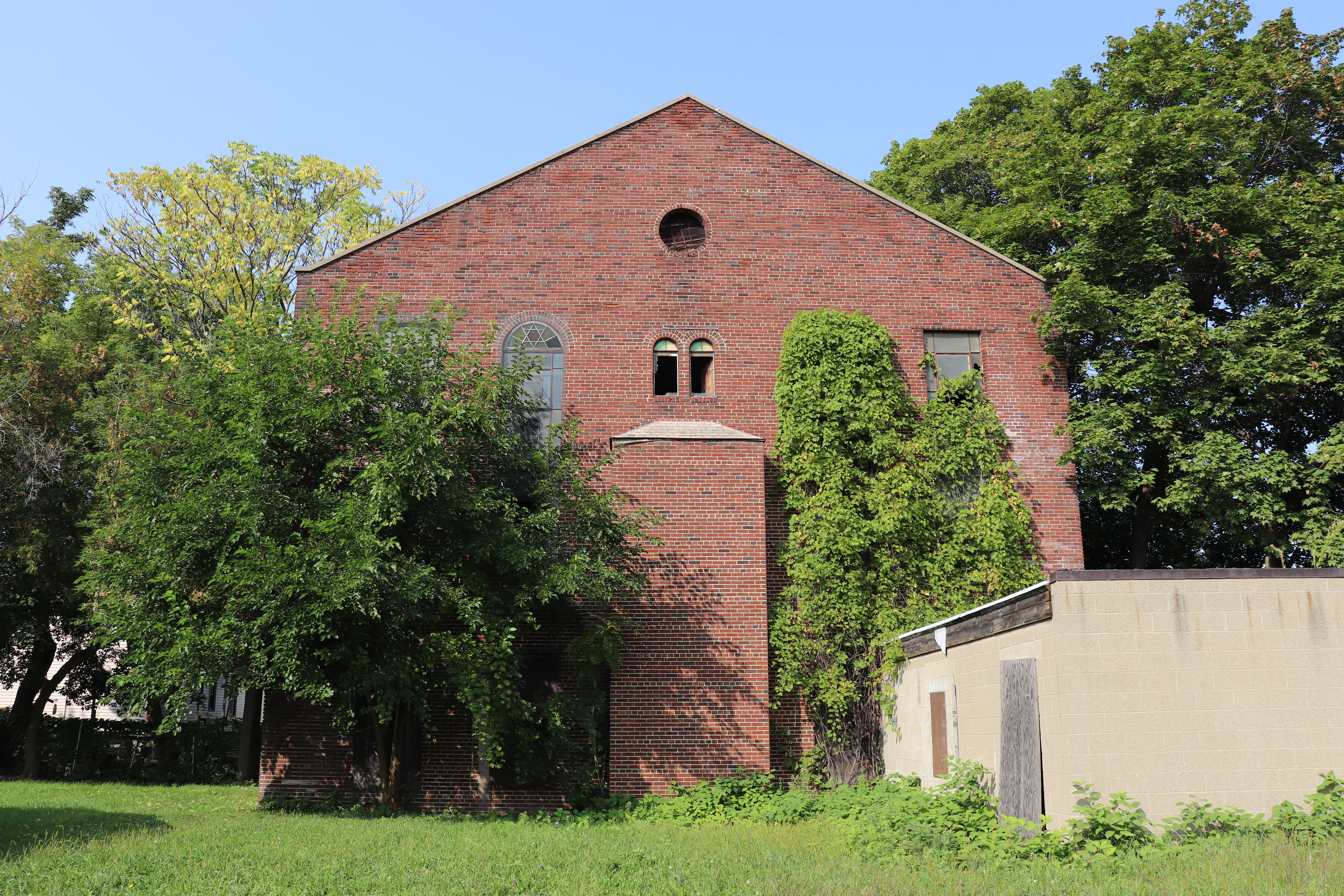
Rear

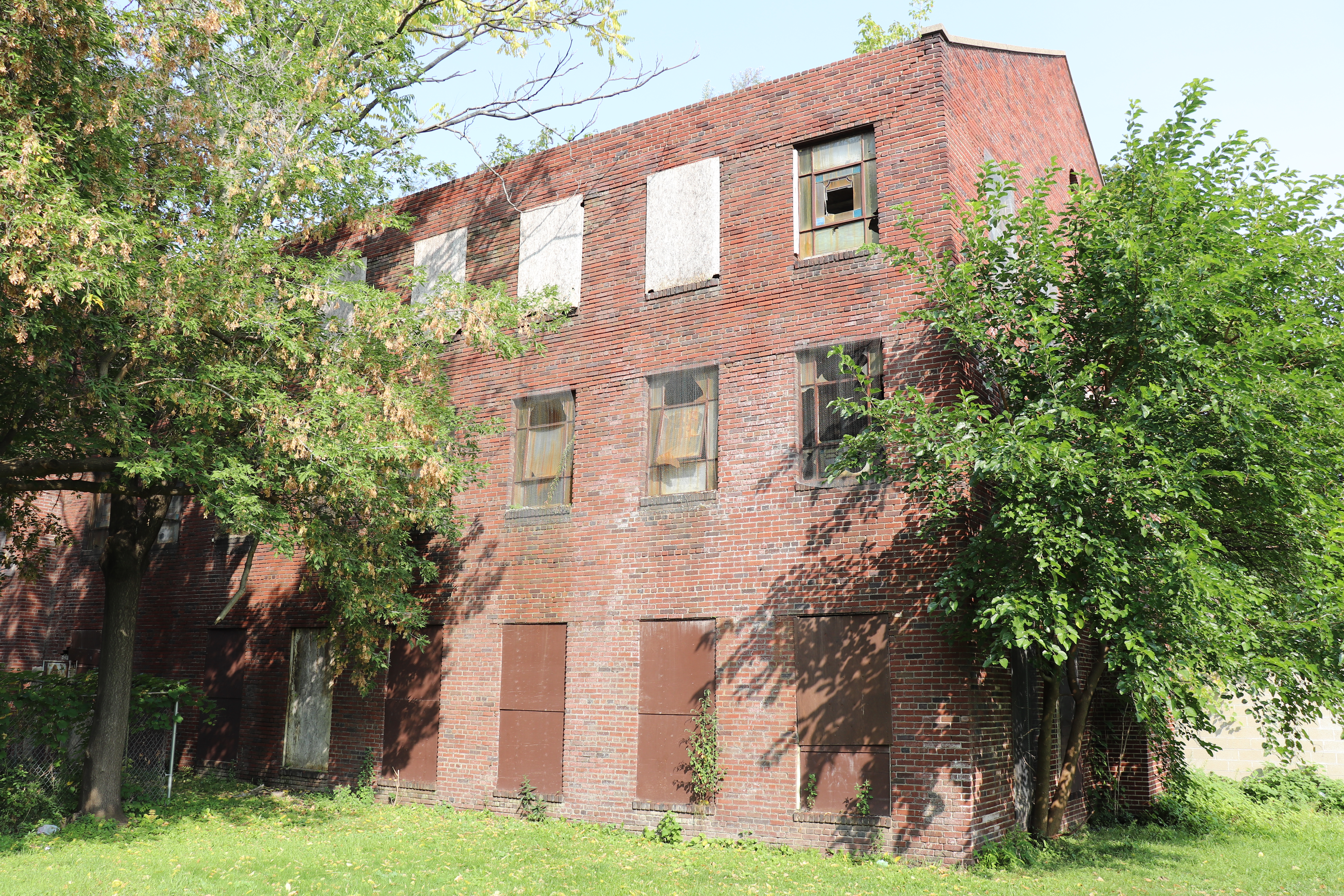
Rear corner

== See also ==
- Leopold Street Shule
