= Leopold Street Shule =

- U.S. National Register of Historic Places
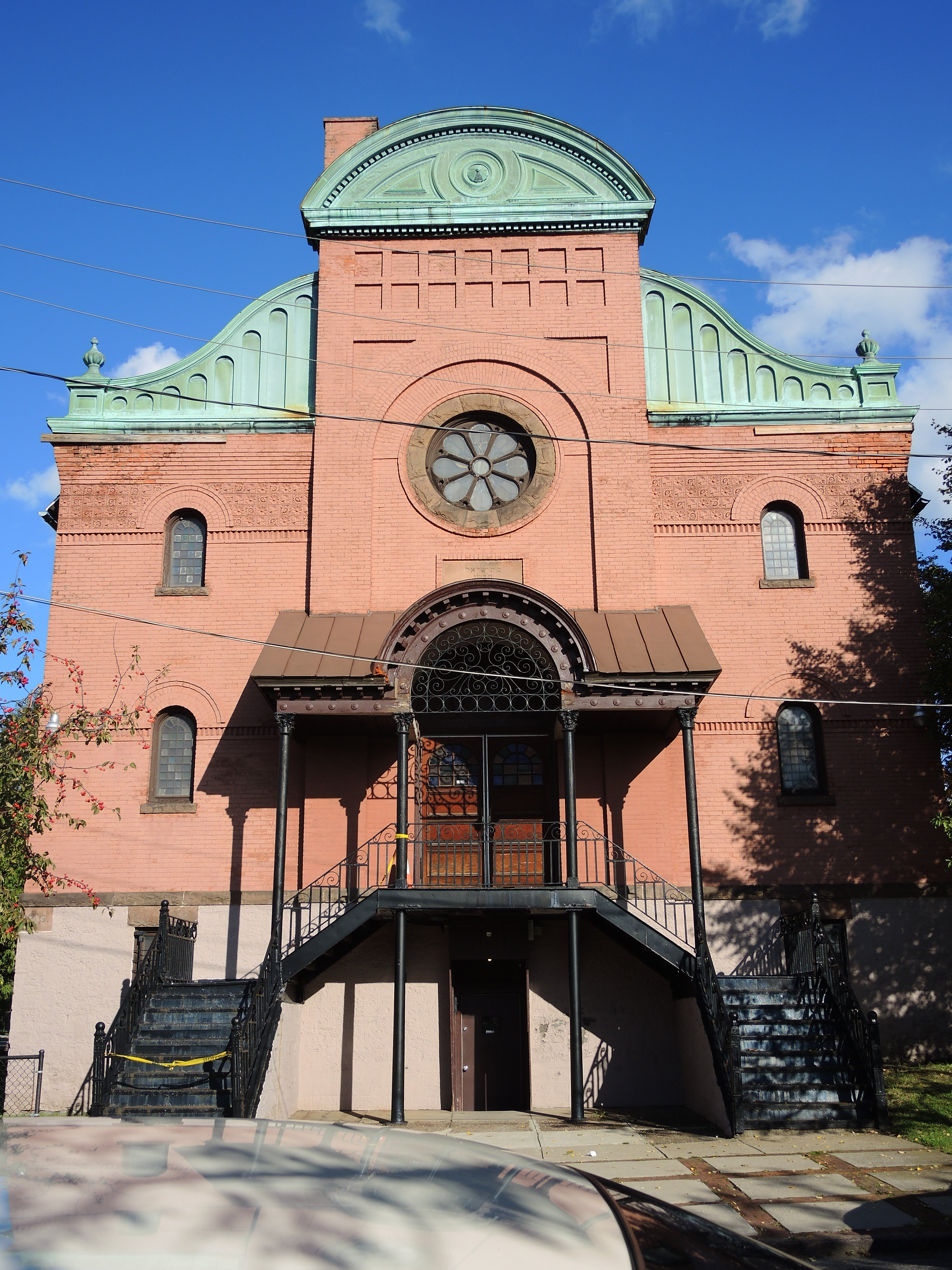
- Leopold Street Shule, September 2013

- Location within New York Location within the United States
- Location: 30 Leopold St., Rochester, New York
- Coordinates: 43°9′53″N 77°36′16″W
- Area: less than one acre
- Built: 1886
- NRHP reference No.: 74001260
- Added to NRHP: June 07, 1974

Leopold Street Shule is a historic synagogue located at Rochester in Monroe County, New York. It was built in 1886 and is a rectangular brick building set on a high cut stone foundation measuring 45 feet by 85 feet. It was built by Eastern European Jews affiliated with the orthodox Beth Israel Congregation. In 1973, the former synagogue was purchased by the Church of God and Saints of Christ, a Hebrew Israelite congregation.

It was listed on the National Register of Historic Places in 1974.

== Gallery ==
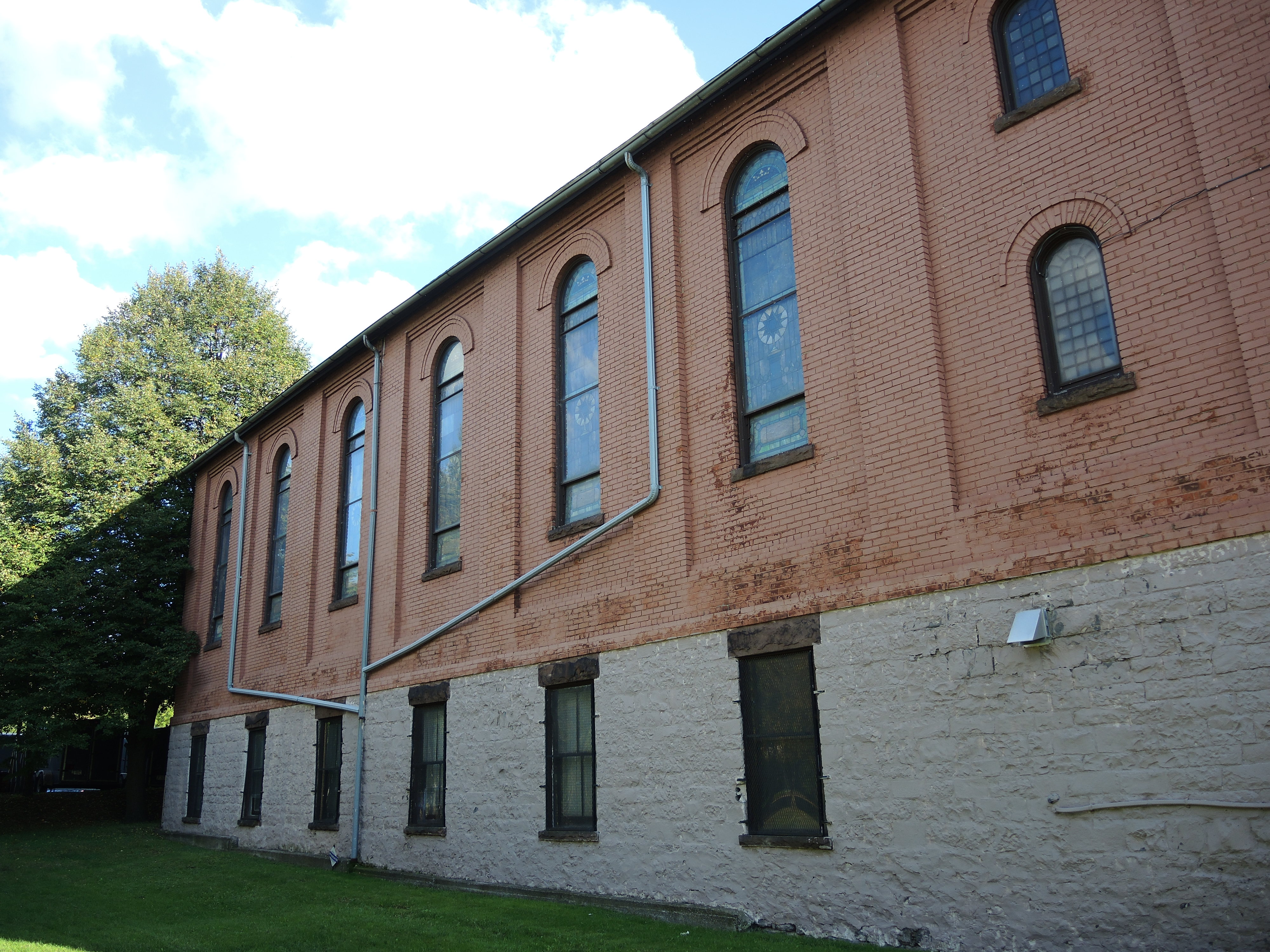

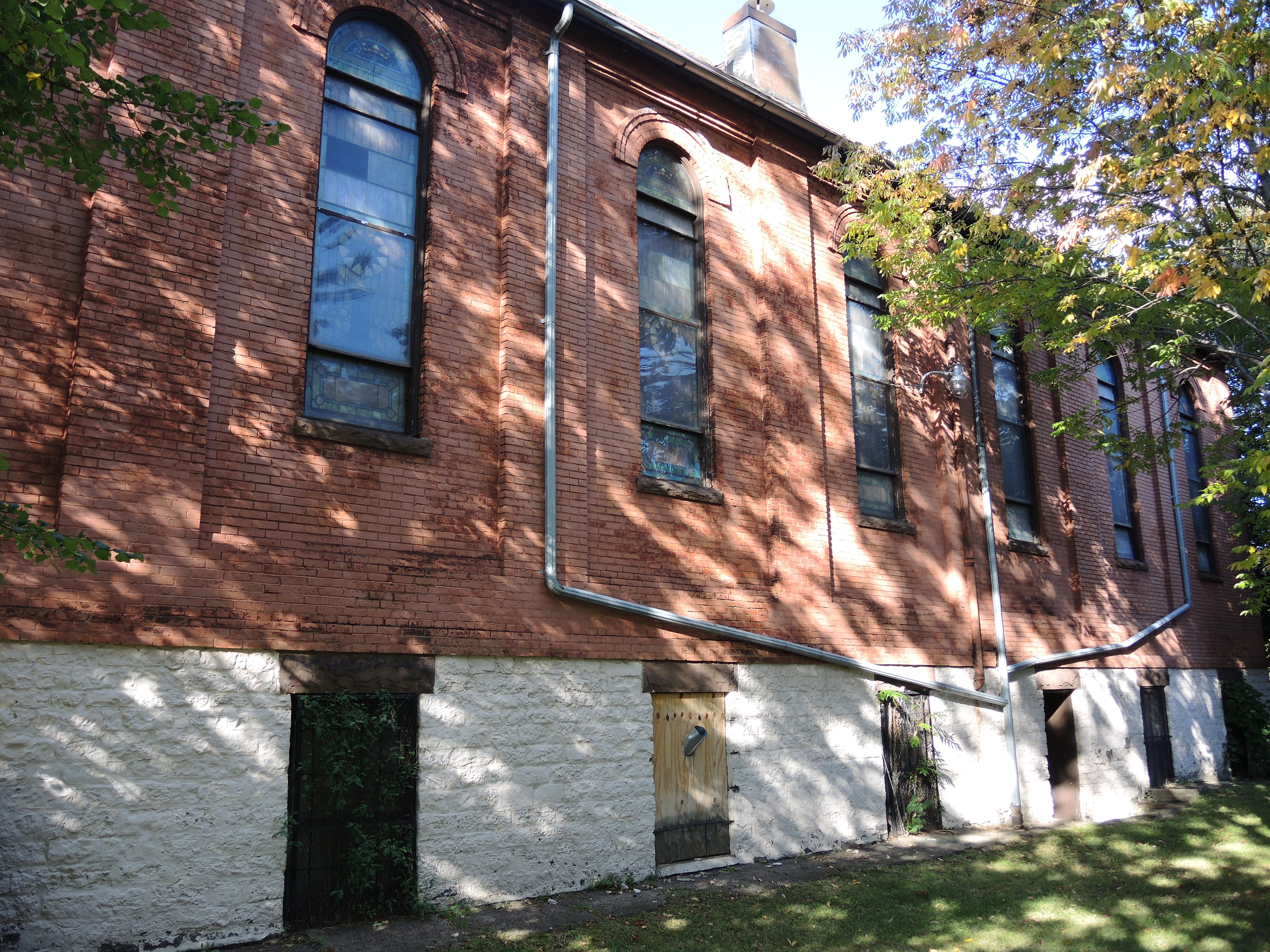

== See also ==
- Congregation Ahavas Achim Anshi Austria
