= B'nai Israel Synagogue (Baltimore) =

Historic synagogue in Maryland, US

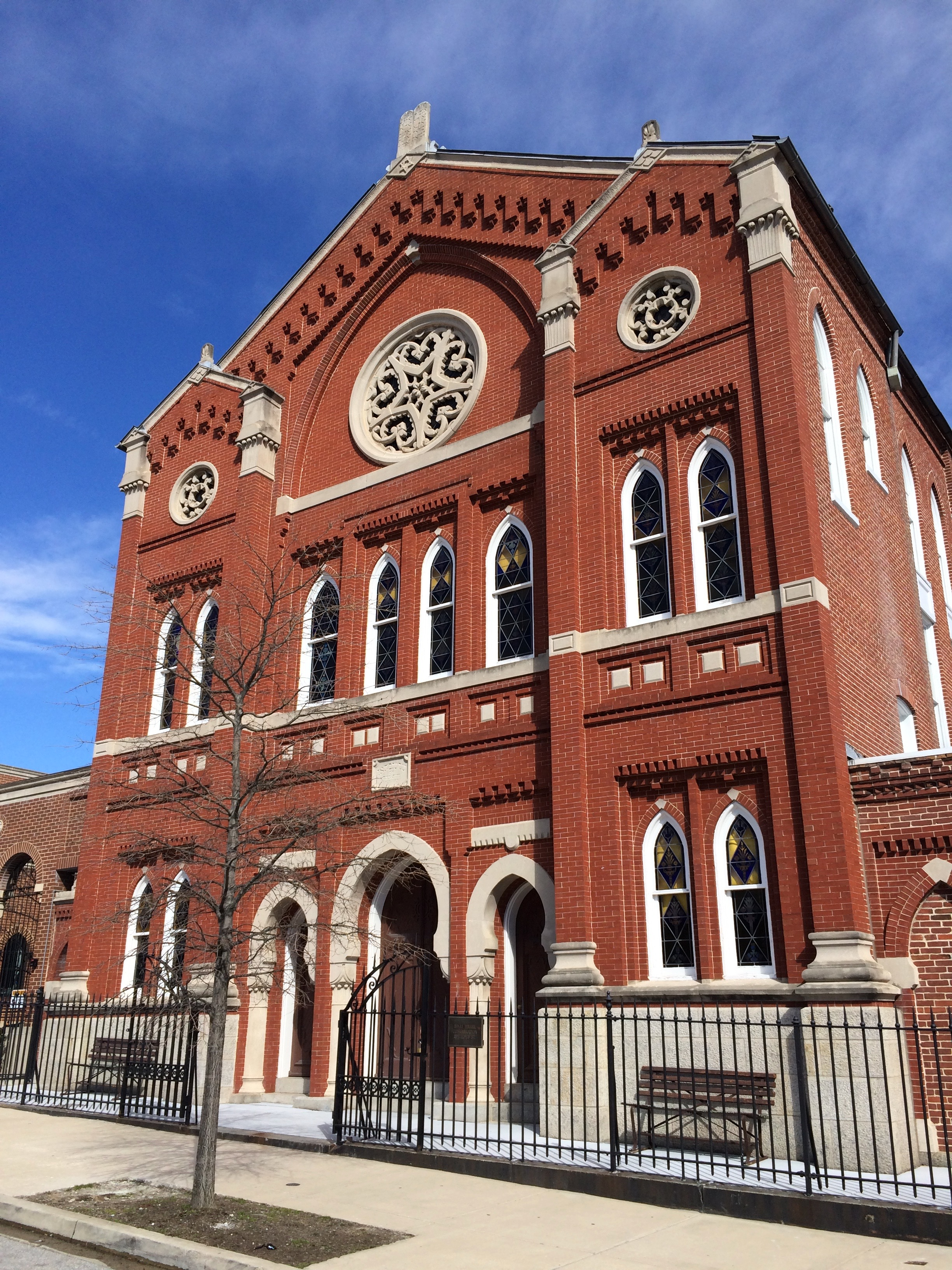
- B'nai Israel Synagogue, in 2017

- Location in Baltimore

Religion
- Affiliation: Modern Orthodox Judaism
- Ecclesiastical or organisational status: Synagogue
- Leadership: Rabbi Etan Mintz
- Status: Active

Location
- Location: 27-35 Lloyd Street, Baltimore, Maryland
- Country: United States
- Coordinates: 39°17′24″N 76°36′04″W

Architecture
- Architect: Henry Burck
- Type: Synagogue architecture
- Style: Gothic Revival; Moorish Revival
- Established: 1873 (as a congregation)
- Completed: 1876 (for Chizuk Amuno)
- Materials: Red brick

Website
- jewishdowntown.org
- Chizuk Amuno Synagogue
- U.S. National Register of Historic Places
- Area: less than one acre
- NRHP reference No.: 78003141
- Added to NRHP: April 19, 1978
- B'nai Israel Synagogue
- Baltimore City Landmark No. 43
- BCL No.: 43
- Designated BCL: 1977

B'nai Israel Synagogue is a Modern Orthodox synagogue located in the historic Jonestown neighborhood, near downtown and the Inner Harbor of Baltimore, Maryland, United States. The synagogue is one of the oldest synagogue buildings in the United States.

The spiritual leader of B'nai Israel Synagogue is Rabbi Etan Mintz.

The synagogue building was listed as a Baltimore City Landmark in 1977; and was listed on the National Register of Historic Places in 1978.

== History ==
A group of members of Baltimore Hebrew Congregation believed that the congregation had become too liberal and modernistic. In 1873 they formed a new congregation, Chizuk Amuno.

Members of a Russian speaking congregation made of immigrants from the pale of settlement broke off from a Polish speaking congregation. The "Ruschie Shul" would practice wherever they could: people's houses, the upper levels of grocery stores. In the years between 1880 and 1910, hundreds of thousands of Jews came from the Pale of Settlement, and the longstanding German Jews moved to North West Baltimore.

The building itself was built by Chizuk Amuno Congregation in 1876. Chizuk Amuno Congregation sold the building to B'nai Israel for $12,000 in 1895 when it moved to Northwest Baltimore.

In 1973, the congregation began raising funds for the restoration of the synagogue.

B'nai Israel donated land to the City of Baltimore to build a park near the synagogue in 1975. Named Freedom Park, the park honors victims of oppression.

== Architecture ==
The synagogue building is a subdued Victorian Gothic Revival structure that synthesizes Romanesque Revival and Moorish Revival elements with traditional Jewish symbols. The architect was Henry Burck, whose design was supposedly based on that of the Schiffschul in Vienna. The carpentry was done by E. F. Hausen and the interior frescoes by F. Moore. The building was completed in 1876 as a place of worship for the Chizuk Amuno Congregation, founded in 1871 as an Orthodox congregation. This congregation occupied the Lloyd Street synagogue until 1895, when it moved McCulloh and Mosher Streets, and later to Eutaw Place and Chauncy Avenue. In 1958, the Chizuk Amuno Congregation moved to its present site on Stevenson Road in Baltimore County.

The Aron Kodesh is an architectural fantasy in carved wood, with the cabinet in which the Torah scrolls are stored, surrounded by a pair of tall minarets.

The building was listed on the National Register of Historic Places on April 19, 1978.

The building is now part of the Jewish Museum of Maryland.

== See also ==
- Baltimore City Landmarks
- History of the Jews in Baltimore
