= Saint-Martin-le-Vinoux =

Saint-Martin-le-Vinoux Sant-Martin-lo-Vinox (Arpitan)
- Commune
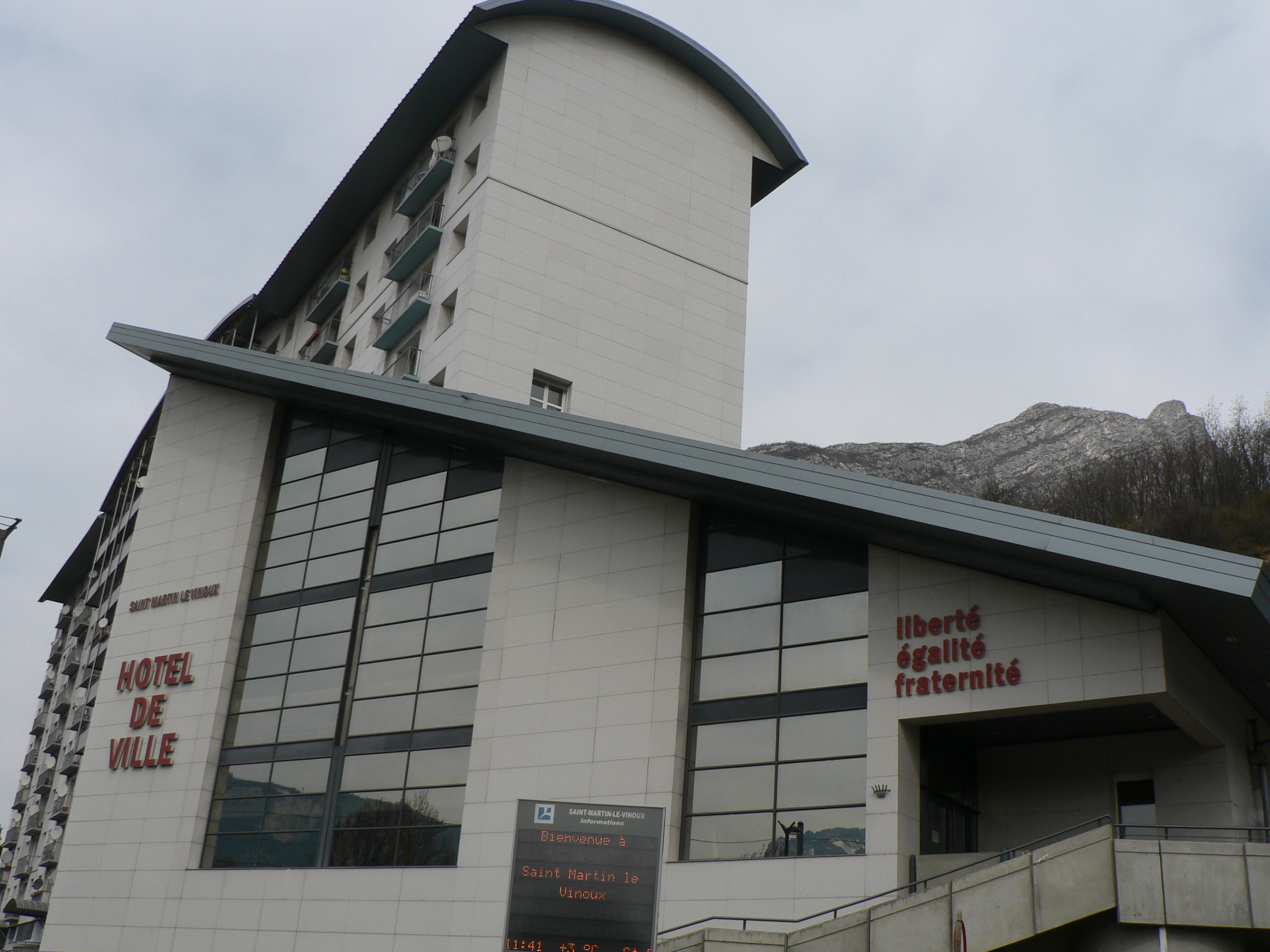
- Town hall

- Coat of arms
- Location of Saint-Martin-le-Vinoux
- Location within France Location within Auvergne-Rhône-Alpes
- Coordinates: 45°12′14″N 5°43′02″E
- Country: France
- Region: Auvergne-Rhône-Alpes
- Department: Isère
- Arrondissement: Grenoble
- Canton: Grenoble-2
- Intercommunality: Grenoble-Alpes Métropole

Government
  - Mayor (2020–2026): Sylvain Laval
- Area^{1}: 10.06 km^{2} (3.88 sq mi)
- Elevation: 251 m (823 ft)
- Highest elevation: 1,299 m (4,262 ft)
- Lowest elevation: 205 m (673 ft)
- Population (2023): 6,078
  - Density: 604.2/km^{2} (1,565/sq mi)
- Time zone: UTC+01:00 (CET)
  - Summer (DST): UTC+02:00 (CEST)
- INSEE/Postal code: 38423 /38950
- ^{1} French Land Register data, which excludes lakes, ponds, glaciers > 1 km^{2} (0.386 sq mi or 247 acres) and river estuaries.

Saint-Martin-le-Vinoux (French pronunciation: [sɛ̃ maʁtɛ̃ lə vinu]; Arpitan: Sant-Martin-lo-Vinox) is a commune in the Isère department in southeastern France, named after Saint Martin and the region's vineyards. It is part of the Grenoble urban unit (agglomeration). It is located north of the Isère, with an area of 1,006 hectares and altitudes from 205 to 1299 meters.

== Population ==
Historical population

Year	Pop.	±% p.a.
1793	753	—
1800	888	+2.38%
1806	723	−3.37%
1821	734	+0.10%
1831	891	+1.96%
1836	1,044	+3.22%
1841	1,204	+2.89%
1846	1,138	−1.12%
1851	1,076	−1.11%
1856	1,080	+0.07%
1861	1,124	+0.80%
1866	1,124	+0.00%
1872	1,140	+0.24%
1876	1,471	+6.58%
1881	1,565	+1.25%
1886	972	−9.09%
1891	1,013	+0.83%
1896	946	−1.36%
1901	958	+0.25%

Year	Pop.	±% p.a.
1906	888	−1.51%
1911	900	+0.27%
1921	1,022	+1.28%
1926	1,110	+1.67%
1931	1,647	+8.21%
1936	1,731	+1.00%
1946	1,903	+0.95%
1954	2,672	+4.33%
1962	3,849	+4.67%
1968	5,843	+7.20%
1975	5,582	−0.65%
1982	5,251	−0.87%
1990	5,139	−0.27%
1999	5,187	+0.10%
2007	5,348	+0.38%
2012	5,455	+0.40%
2017	5,778	+1.16%
2023	6,078	+0.85%

Source: EHESS and INSEE (1968-2023)

== Twin towns ==
Saint-Martin-le-Vinoux is twinned with:

- Brotterode, Germany, since 1993
- Moribabougou, Mali, since 1998
- Bălcești, Romania, since 1998

== See also ==
- Casamaures
- Communes of the Isère department
