= Chizuk Amuno Congregation =

Conservative congregation and synagogue in Baltimore, Maryland, United States

- Hebrew: ק"ק חזוק אמונה
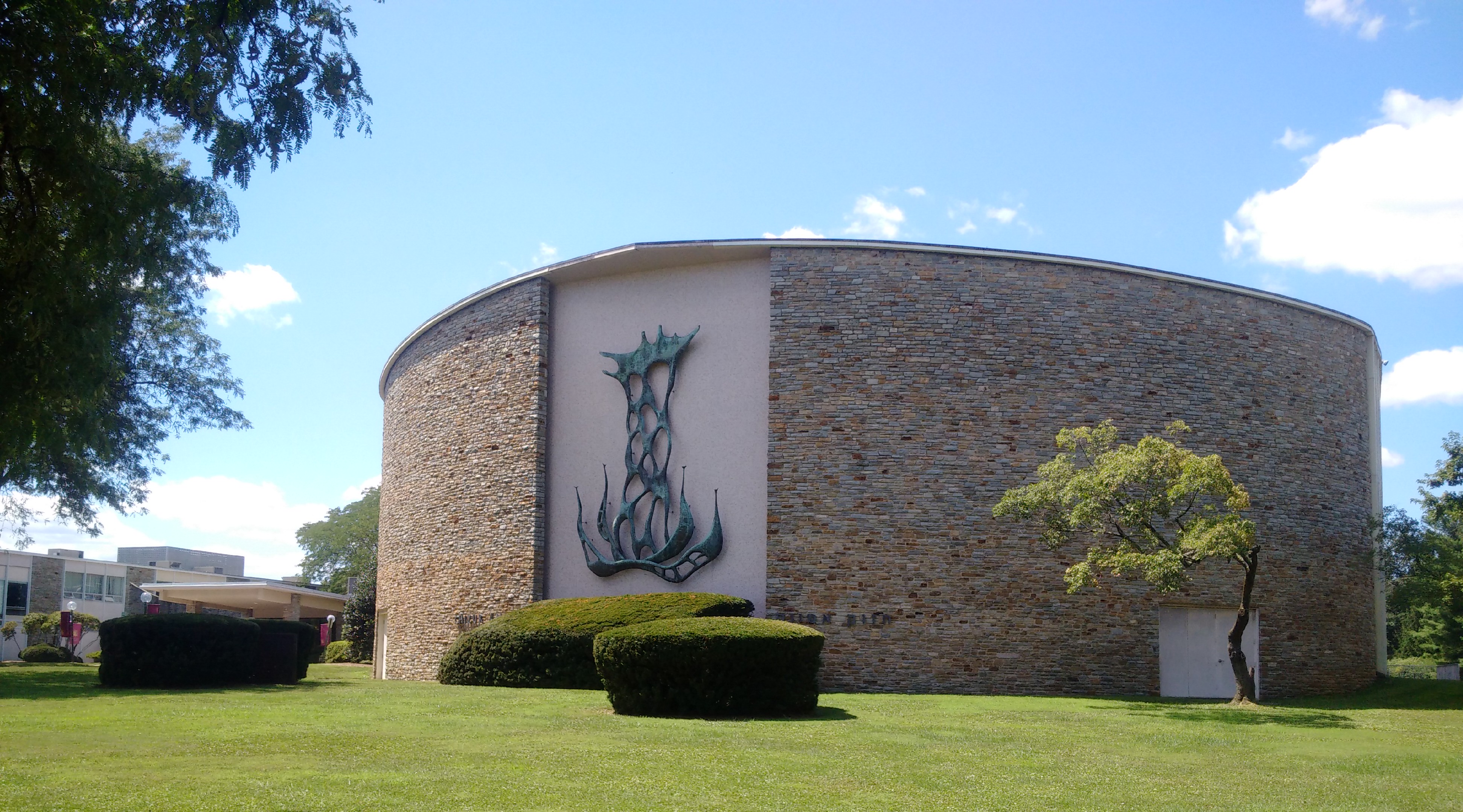
- The Pikesville synagogue, in 2019

- Location in Maryland

Religion
- Affiliation: Conservative Judaism
- Ecclesiastical or organisational status: Synagogue
- Leadership: Rabbi Joshua Z. Gruenberg; Rabbi Deborah Wechsler
- Status: Active

Location
- Location: Stevenson Road, Pikesville, Baltimore, Maryland
- Country: United States
- Coordinates: 39°23′35″N 76°42′51″W

Architecture
- Type: Synagogue architecture
- Established: 1871 (as a congregation)
- Completed: 1876 (Lloyd Street); 1895 (McCulloh Street); 1922 (Eutaw Place); 1958 (Pikesville)

Website
- chizukamuno.org

Chizuk Amuno Congregation (Hebrew: ק"ק חזוק אמונה, lit. 'Strengthening of Faith') is a Conservative Jewish congregation and synagogue, located on Stevenson Road, in Pikesville, a suburb of Baltimore, Maryland, in the United States.

== Principles ==
Chizuk Amuno, which defines itself as "a traditional, Conservative, egalitarian congregation" that strongly supports the Jewish Theological Seminary of America and the United Synagogue of Conservative Judaism. Chizuk Amuno uses as its guiding principle the three pillars of world as stated in Pirkei Avoth 1:2, "Torah: Life-Long Learning," "Avodah: Worship and Observance", and "Gemilut Hasadim: Acts of Loving Kindness." Chizuk Amuno also seeks perform tikkun olam, repairing the world and encourages its congregants to lead an ethical, Jewish life.

== History ==
=== 19th century ===
Chizuk Amuno was founded in Baltimore on April 1, 1871, formed through a split from the "Green Street synagogue" – the Baltimore Hebrew Congregation – who resigned in protest of reforms made to the traditional services, based on Jewish customs and practice.

==== Lloyd Street ====
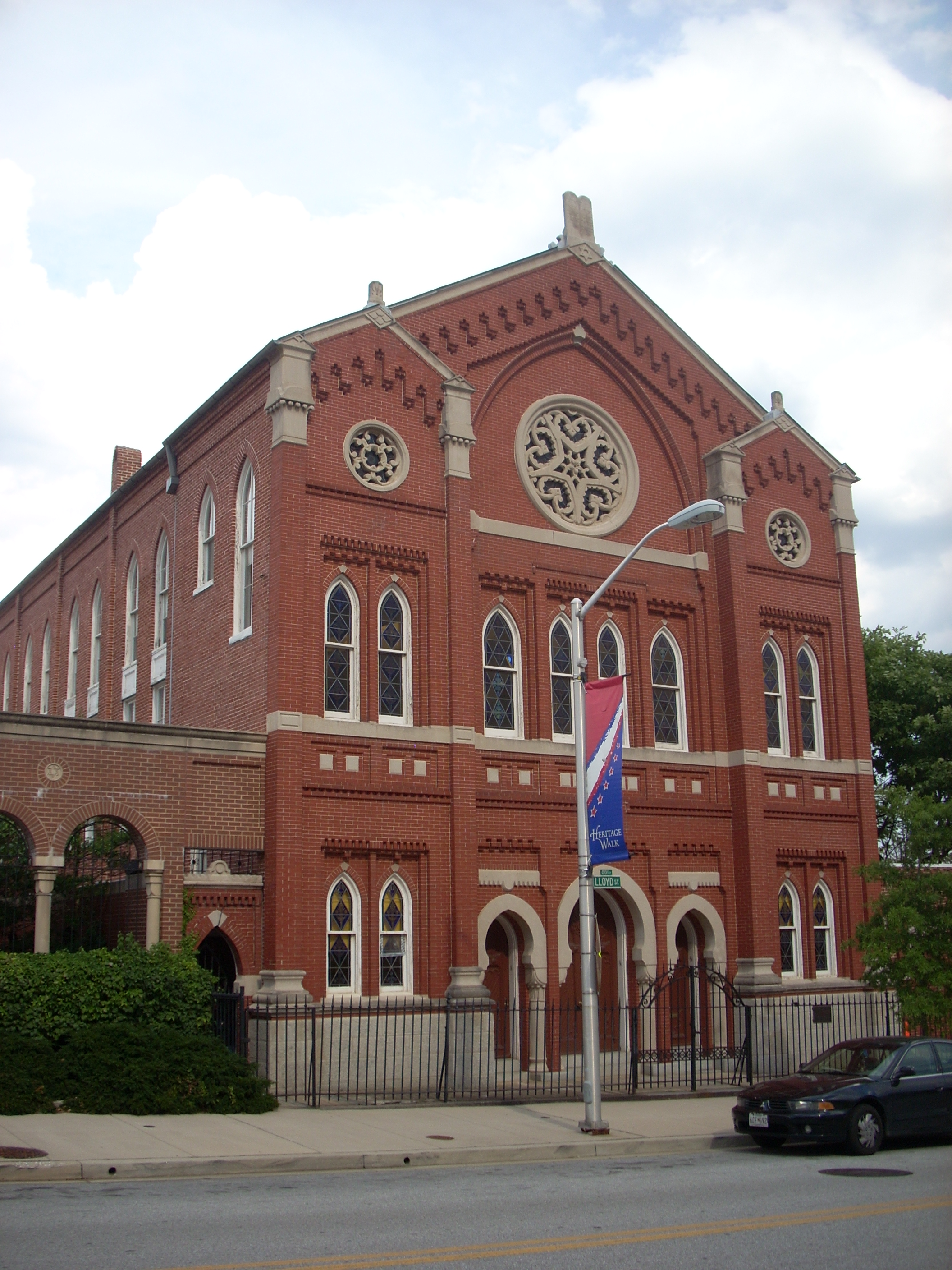
Former Chizuk Amuno Synagogue (1876–1895)

In 1876, the congregation moved into its first permanent home of distinctive Gothic Revival design, the old Chizuk Amuno Synagogue on Lloyd Street.

Under the spiritual guidance of Rev. Dr. Henry W. Schneeberger, the "first American-born, ordained rabbi", the congregation grew greatly and soon moved in 1895 to nearby McCulloh Street in the Bolton Hill neighborhood (Md. Route 129) after selling its Lloyd Street building to the B'nai Israel ("Sons of Israel") congregation which had been founded 1873 by recently immigrated Russian Jews. The building is now next door to and part of the Herbert Bearman campus of the Jewish Historical Society of Maryland in 1985 along with the original Lloyd Street Synagogue, both of which are now on the National Register of Historic Places.

The synagogue later split into the Shearith Israel Congregation, and the somewhat more liberal, though still strictly Orthodox, Chizuk Emunah Congregation, under the leadership of its president, Dr. Aaron Fredenwald. The congregation was a supporter of the aforementioned JTS and the Jewish Publication Society (JPS) at their founding under Orthodox auspices, with Dr. Friedenwald being a Director, and Vice President, respectively of the two organizations. Friedenwald remained Orthodox all his life, but after his death, JTS and JPS became affiliated with the nascent Conservative movement, and the synagogue became a founding member of USCJ.

=== 20th century to the present ===
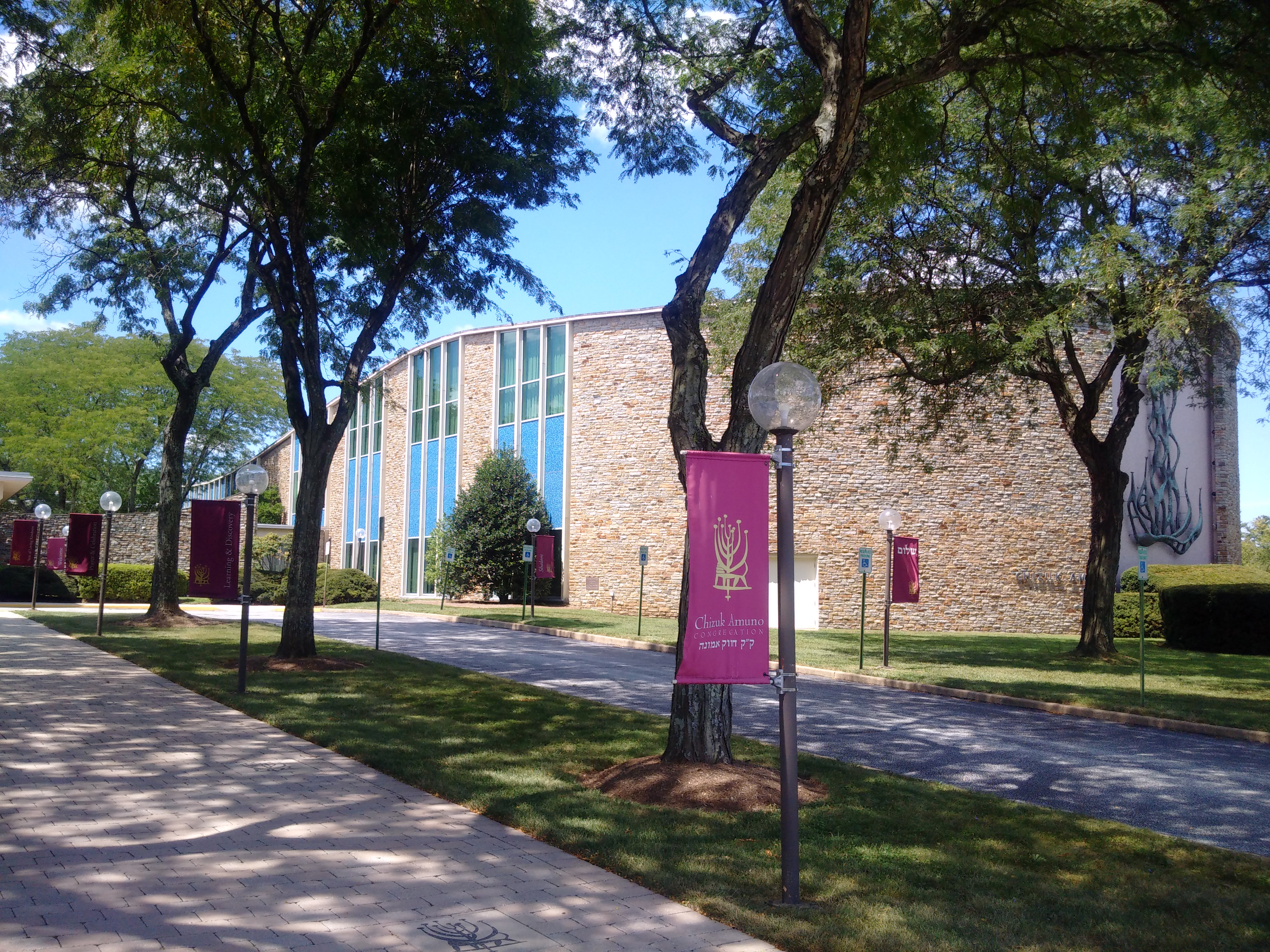
The synagogue's entrance

In 1920, the synagogue gained both a new rabbi, Rabbi Adolph Coblenz, and moved once again uptown to a building on Eutaw Place. After Rabbi Israel M. Goldman began his tenure at Chizuk Amuno in 1948, plans were begun to move the congregation to a "suburban campus...to house a Social Center, School Building, and Sanctuary." The new synagogue was located on previously undeveloped land in the northwest suburb of Pikesville in Baltimore County and was in use by the 1960s.

In 1980, Rabbi Joel H. Zaiman became the congregation's rabbi. Under Zaiman, both Chizuk Amuno's youth and adult education would be expanded and the congregation doubled in size to 1,400 families during the 23 years of his leadership. In 1981, a Solomon Schechter Day School (today called Krieger Schechter) was opened in conjunction with the congregation. In addition to founding schools, Chizuk Amuno also emphasized Gemilut Hasadim or "acts of loving kindness" in serving city communities during Zaiman's rabbinate. These programs, such as mentoring high school students, continue to the present day. Following Rabbi Zaiman's retirement, Rabbi Ronald J. Shulman was elected spiritual leader of Chizuk Amuno from 2004 -2017. The Congregation's current Senior Rabbi since July 2018 is Joshua Z. Gruenberg. He earned a bachelor's degree in political science from the State University of New York at Binghamton and was ordained as a Conservative rabbi by the Jewish Theological Seminary in 2002.

== Notable people ==
- Sidney Sakols (1916–2007), real estate executive, World War II veteran, composer, inventor, activist

== Education ==
Chizuk Amuno offers education centers for youth and adult education:

- The Goldsmith Early Childhood Center (preschool)
- Krieger Schechter Day School (K-8 day school, member of the Solomon Schechter Day School Association and accredited by the Association of Independent Maryland Schools)
- The Rosenbloom Religious School (bi-weekly program for secular school students)
- Netivon & Achshav (evening high school programs)
- The Stulman Center for Adult Learning

== Activities ==
Logo of Chizuk Amuno Congregation

Chizuk Amuno features many groups (Brotherhood, Sisterhood, Young Professionals, Young Families, and others) intended to enrich synagogue life and "promote the values and ideals of Conservative Judaism."

The congregation is administered by a number of committees over which its president and board of trustees presides.

Chizuk Amuno also operates the Goldsmith Museum, which strives to preserve Jewish history through the visual arts. It also features an extensive interactive timeline of Jewish history and congregational archives.

== See also ==
- History of the Jews in Baltimore
