= Sidney Sakols =

American businessman

Sidney Sakols (November 23, 1916 – July 22, 2007) was a real estate executive, World War II veteran, composer, inventor, activist, and eccentric Baltimore native.

== Biography ==
Sidney's family lived on North Broadway in East Baltimore when he was born in 1916, but they moved to Lake Drive in Reservoir Hill in 1922. Sidney resided there until he died in 2007. During his time there the neighborhood's demographics shifted to being predominantly African-American.

He graduated from Baltimore City College in 1935 and promptly began working for the family real estate business, S. Sakols & Sons. The company managed 25–30 properties, most of them in East Baltimore. Beginning in 1940, he served in the army for four and a half years, reaching the rank of master sergeant. However, he did not find the work he did for the army very fulfilling and stuck to the real-estate business thereafter.

Sakols filed a lawsuit against Baltimore Transit Co. for overcrowded buses in 1950, but he lost his case. He twice ran unsuccessfully for Congress, once in 1958 for the Senate and then again in 1968 for the House of Representatives. Sakols founded the Save Lake Drive Committee in response to the construction of the Jones Falls Expressway and the widening of Lake Drive that resulted from construction. In one demonstration, he managed to personally halt the construction, though only temporarily.

Sakols sang in the Baltimore Symphony Chorus and composed a song entitled "The Governor's March". According to his nephew, David M. Schimmel, "It was recorded by the Naval Academy Band and it was played for the inaugurations of Governors Tawes and McKeldin. But the song, much to his dismay, never became a regular part of the inauguration." Also an opera enthusiast, Sakols invented an “Illuminating Magnifying Lens” for reading libretto without disturbing other attendees of the opera.

Sakols was a Conservative Jew and belonged to the Chizuk Amuno Congregation. He remained a member of the congregation throughout his life, even after the congregation moved out to the Baltimore suburbs.
