= Moorish Revival architecture =

Revival architectural style

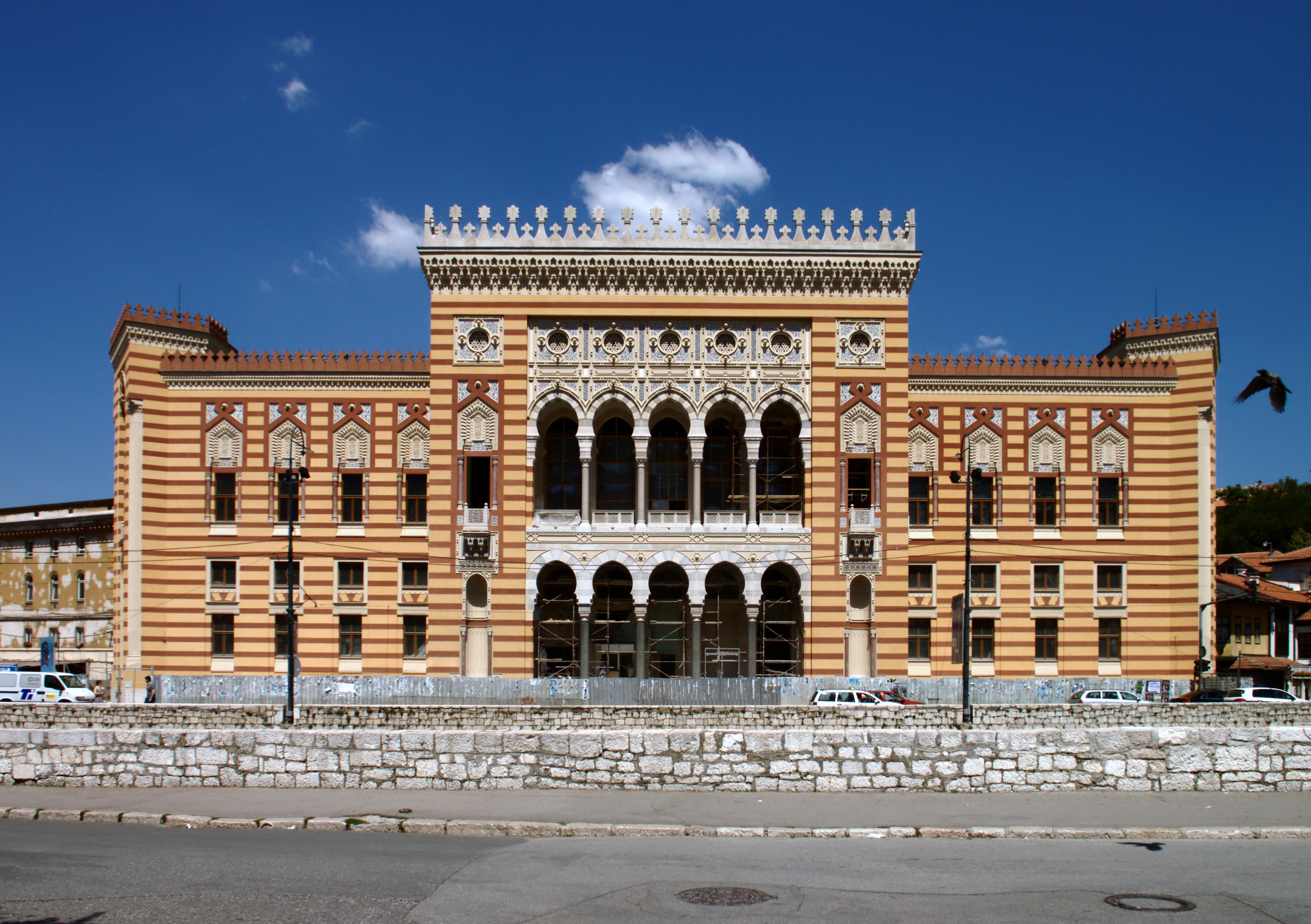
Vijećnica (City Hall) in Sarajevo, 1894

Moorish Revival or Neo-Moorish is one of the exotic revival architectural styles that were adopted by architects of Europe and the Americas in the wake of Romanticist Orientalism. It reached the height of its popularity after the mid-19th century, part of a widening vocabulary of articulated decorative ornament drawn from historical sources beyond familiar classical and Gothic modes. Neo-Moorish architecture drew on elements from classic Moorish architecture and, as a result, from the wider Islamic architecture.

== In Europe ==
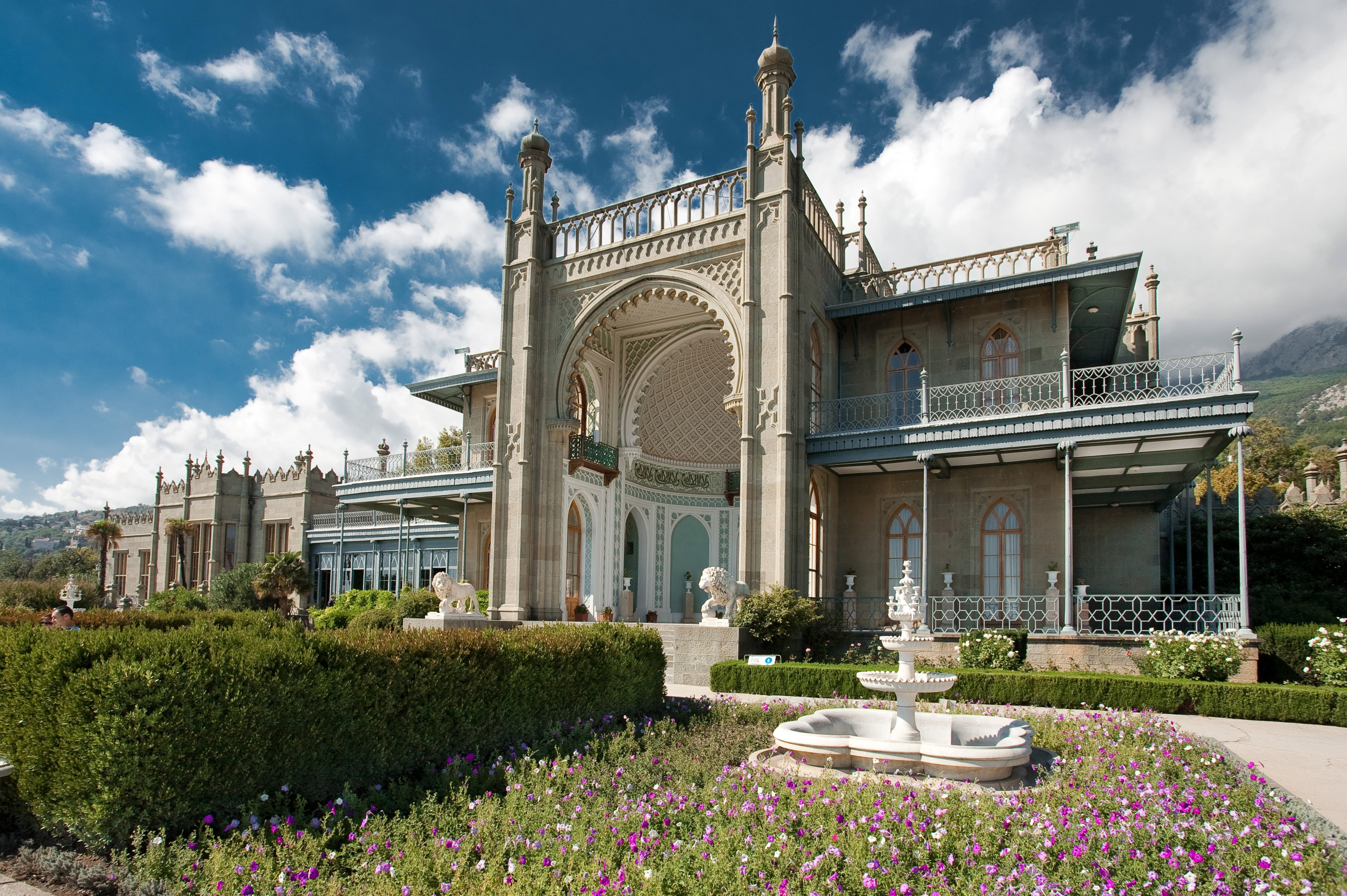
Southern garden façade of Alupka Palace with a massive central exedra forming an open iwan-like vestibule

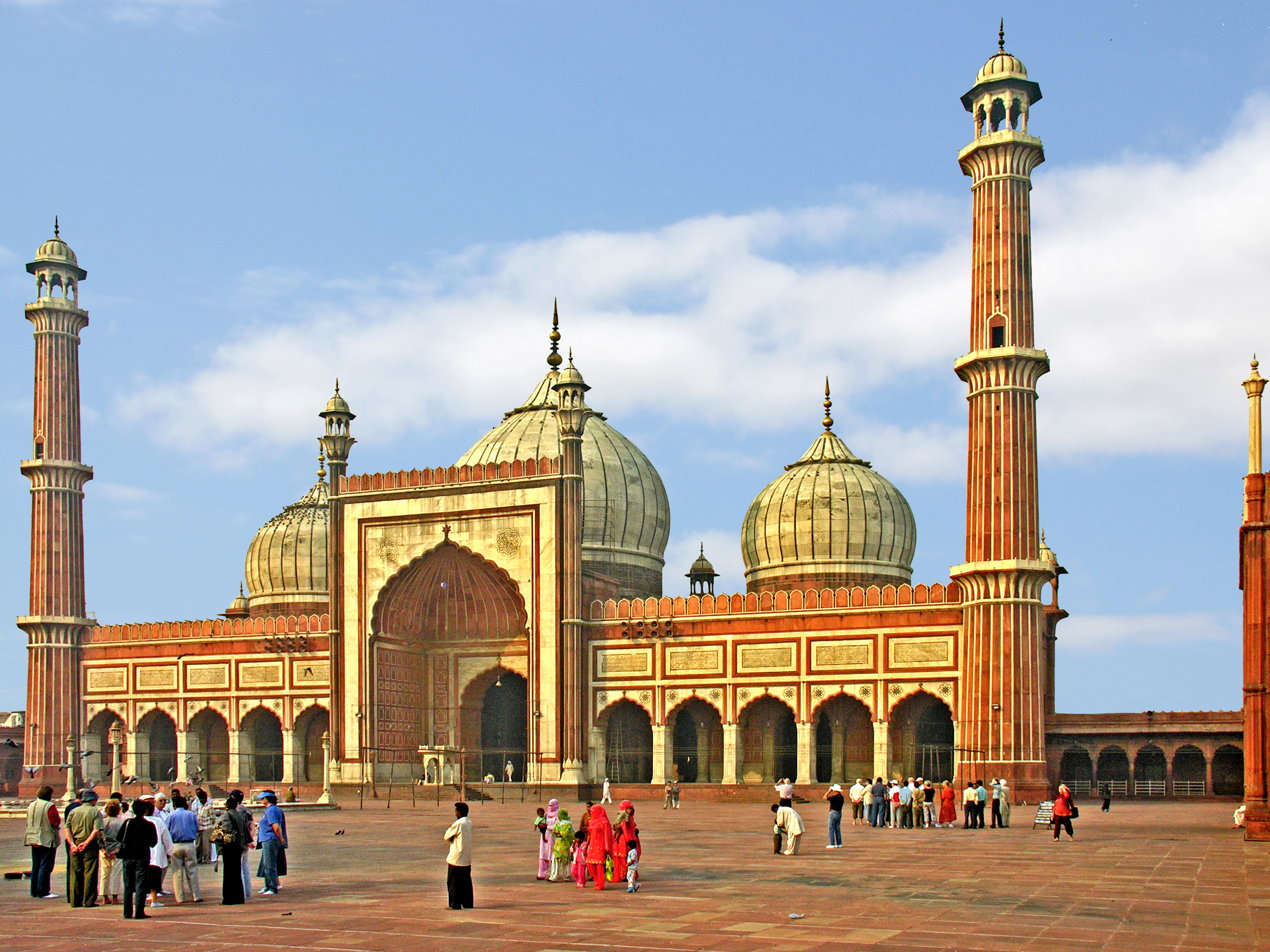
The Jama Masjid was the inspiration for Blore's design.

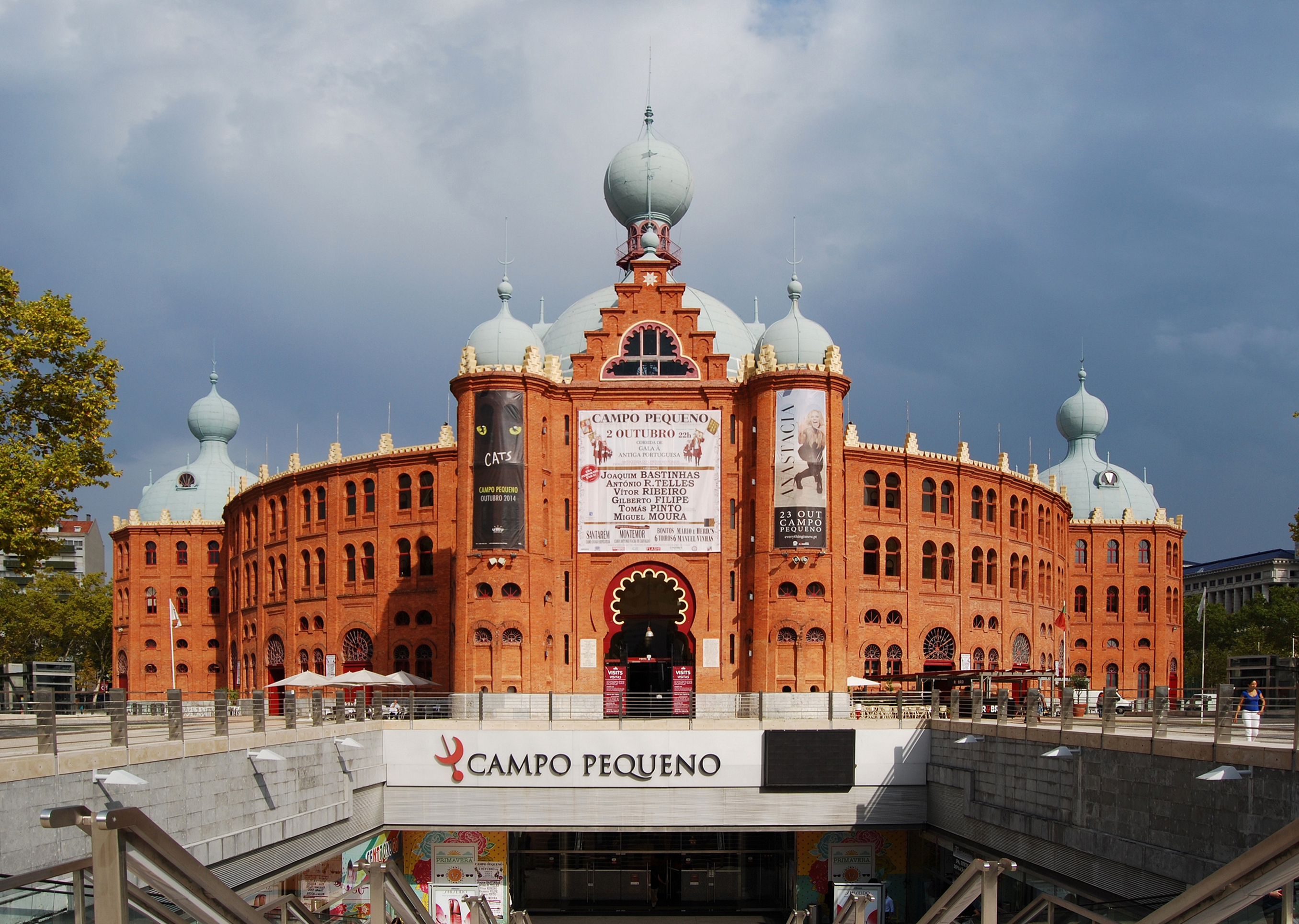
Campo Pequeno Bullring, in Lisbon, Portugal

The "Moorish" garden structures built at Sheringham Park in Norfolk, ca. 1812, were an unusual touch at the time, a parallel to chinoiserie, as a dream vision of fanciful whimsy, not meant to be taken seriously; however, as early as 1826, Edward Blore used Islamic arches, domes of various size and shapes and other details of Near Eastern Islamic architecture to great effect in his design for Alupka Palace in Crimea, a cultural setting that had already been penetrated by Ottoman architecture.

By the mid-19th century, the style was adopted by the Jews of Central Europe, who associated Moorish and Mudéjar architectural forms with the Golden age of Jewish culture in Spain. It has also been argued that Jewish communities adopted this architecture (which in Western eyes was seen as stereotypical of "Islamic" or "Oriental" culture more broadly) for more complex reasons; mainly, as an affirmation or reclamation of the Middle Eastern roots of their history and thus as a way of setting themselves apart from the surrounding Western or Christian society. This came at time when Jews were gaining more freedoms in some European societies and the construction of ostentatious synagogues was possible for the first time, thus provoking a search for a new distinct style of architecture. Historian John M. Efron of the University of California at Berkeley regards the popularity of Moorish revival architecture among builders of synagogues as a counterpoint to Edward Said's Orientalism, which criticizes European orientalism as inherently imperialist and racist, since the builders chose the style as an expression of admiration for the culture of the Muslim world. As a consequence, Moorish Revival spread around the globe as a preferred style of synagogue architecture for a long period until the early 20th century.

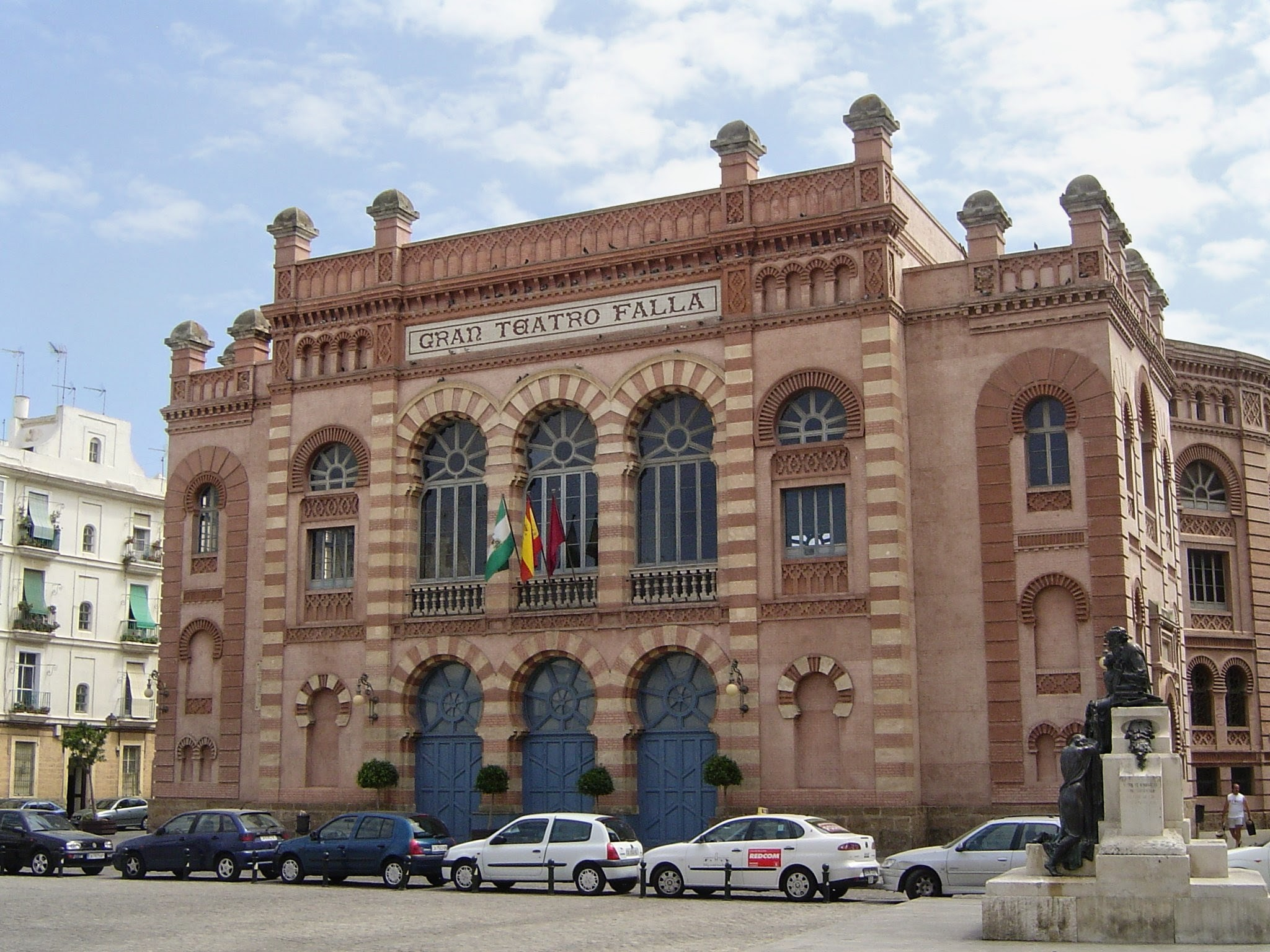
Gran Teatro Falla, Cádiz, Spain

In Spain, the country was conceived as the place of origin of Moorish ornamentation, and the interest in this sort of architecture fluctuated from province to province. The mainstream was called Neo-Mudéjar. In Catalonia, Antoni Gaudí's profound interest in Mudéjar heritage governed the design of his early works, such as Casa Vicens or Astorga Palace. In Andalusia, the Neo-Mudéjar style gained belated popularity in connection with the Ibero-American Exposition of 1929. It was epitomized by Plaza de España of Seville and the Gran Teatro Falla in Cádiz. In Madrid, the Neo-Mudéjar was a characteristic style of housing and public buildings at the turn of the century. In contrast, the 1920s return of interest to the style resulted in such buildings as the bullring of Las Ventas and Diario ABC office. A Spanish nobleman built the Sammezzano, one of Europe's largest and most elaborate Moorish Revival structures, in Tuscany between 1853 and 1889.

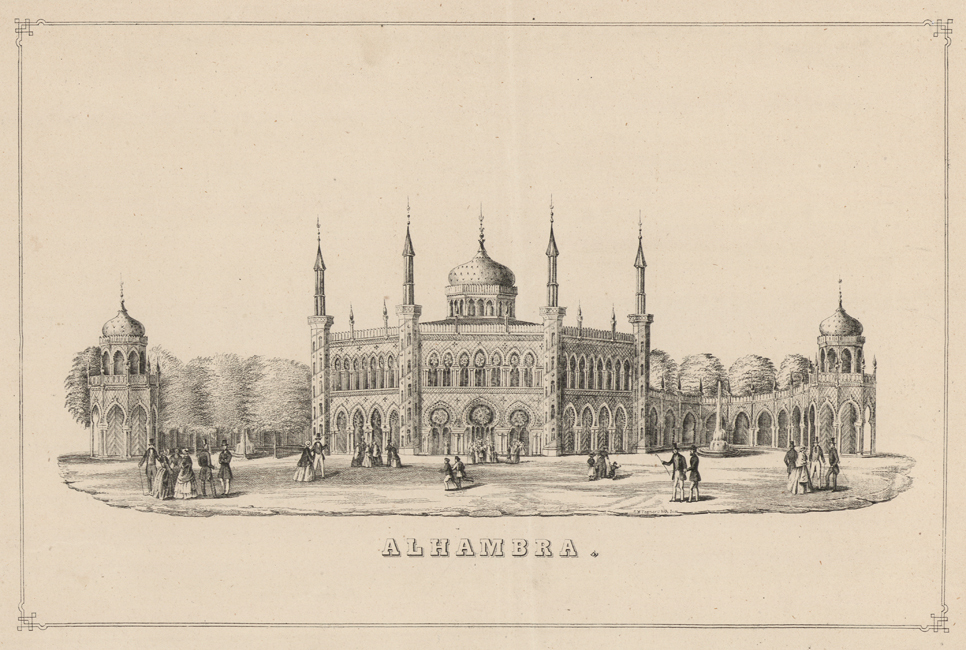
Lithography of the Moorish Castle, a theater built in Moorish Architecture. Location was Frederiksberg, Denmark

Although Carlo Bugatti employed Moorish arcading among the exotic features of his furniture, shown at the 1902 exhibition at Turin, by that time the Moorish Revival was very much on the wane almost everywhere. A notable exception was Imperial Russia, where the shell-encrusted Morozov House in Moscow (a stylisation of the Pena Palace in Sintra), the Neo-Mamluk Dulber palace in Koreiz, and the palace in Likani exemplified the continuing development of the style.

=== In the Balkans ===
Another exception was Bosnia, where, after its occupation by Austria-Hungary, the new authorities commissioned a range of Neo-Moorish structures. The aim was to promote Bosnian national identity while avoiding its association with either the Ottoman Empire or the growing pan-Slavic movement by creating an "Islamic architecture of European fantasy". This included application of ornamentations and other Moorish design strategies neither of which had much to do with prior architectural direction of indigenous Bosnian architecture. The central post office in Sarajevo, for example, follows distinct formal characteristics of design like clarity of form, symmetry, and proportion while the interior followed the same doctrine. Vijećnica in Sarajevo is an example of Pseudo Moorish architectural language using decorations and pointed arches while still integrating other formal elements into the design.

Other notable example in the region is the building of the Regional historical museum in Kardzhali, Bulgaria build in the 1920s, combining also Central Asian styles.

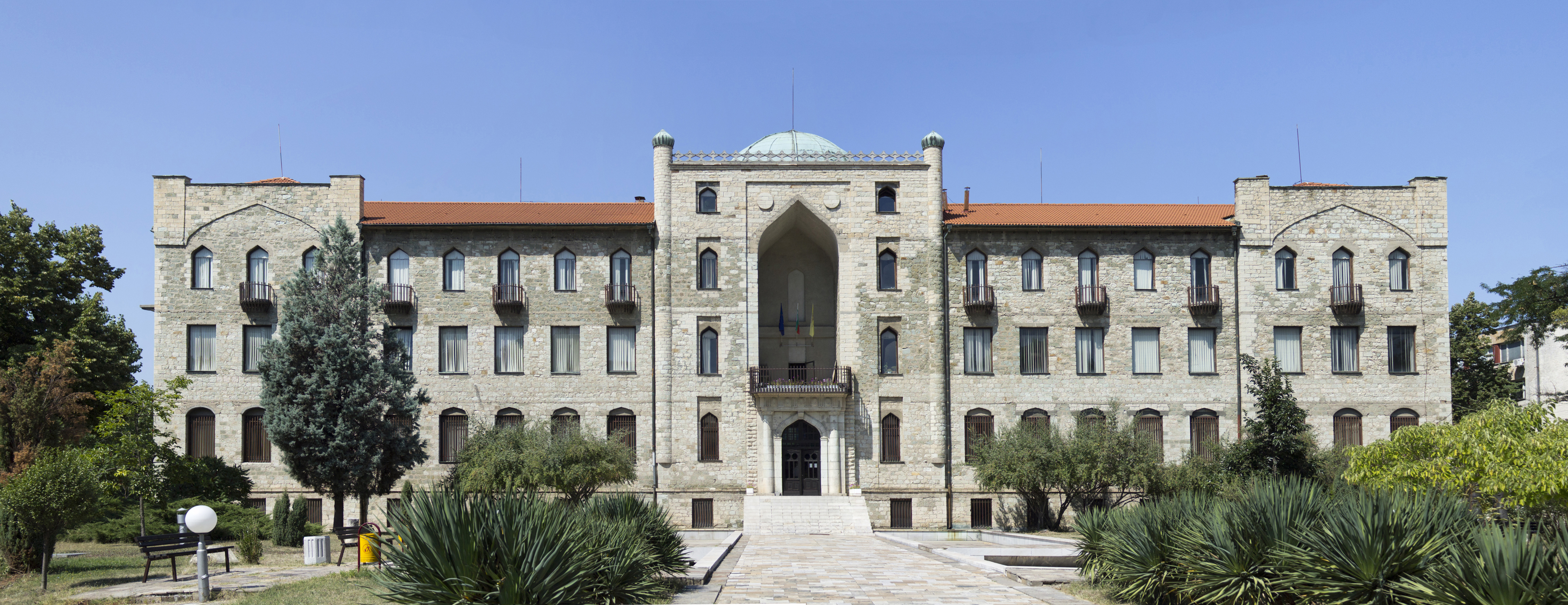
Regional historical museum in Kardzhali in Bulgaria

== In the United States ==
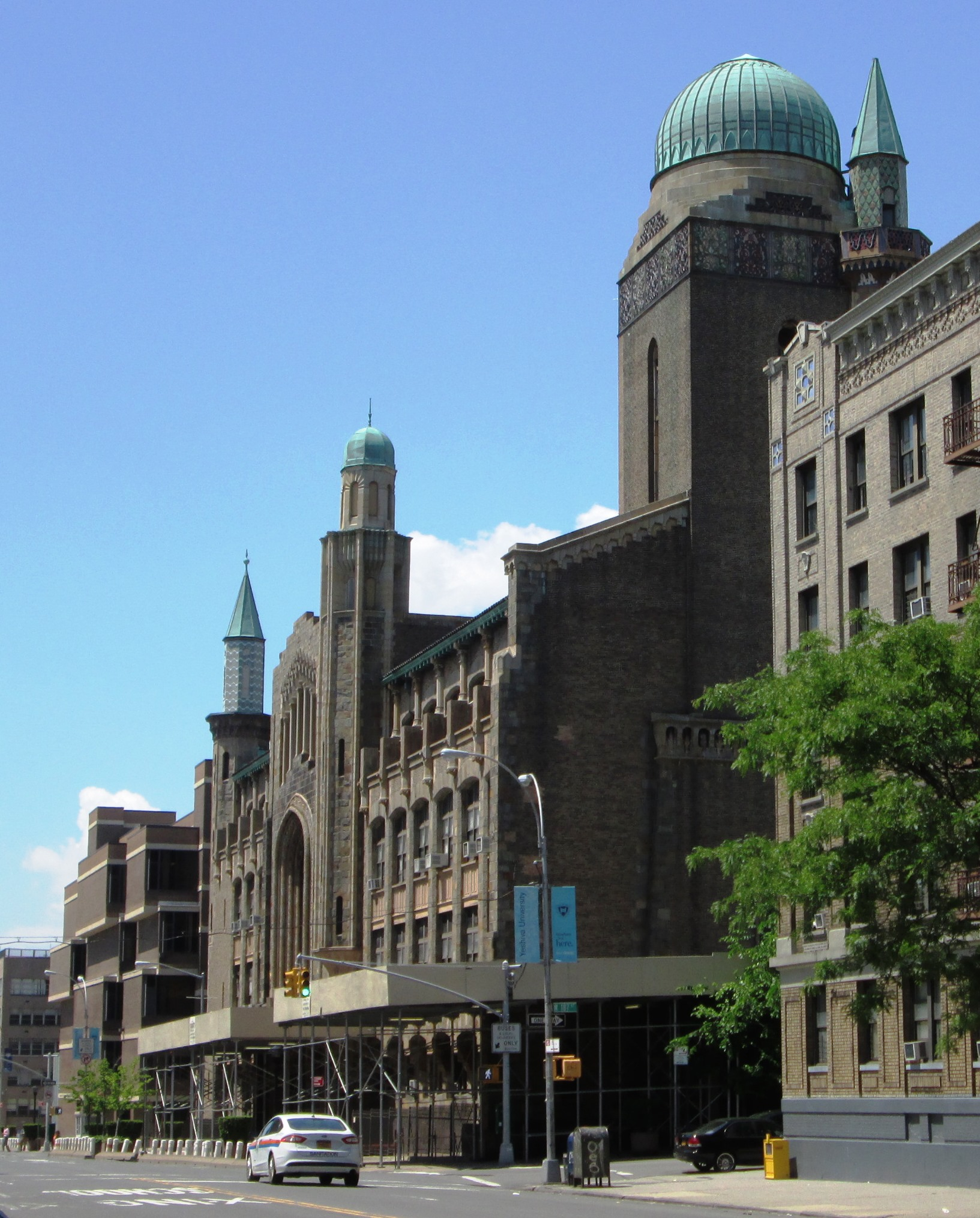
Yeshiva University, New York City

In the United States, Washington Irving's fanciful travel sketch, Tales of the Alhambra (1832), first brought Moorish Andalusia into readers' imaginations; one of the first neo-Moorish structures was Iranistan, a mansion of P. T. Barnum in Bridgeport, Connecticut. Constructed in 1848 and destroyed by fire ten years later, this architectural extravaganza "sprouted bulbous domes and horseshoe arches". In the 1860s, the style spread across America, with Olana, the painter Frederic Edwin Church's house overlooking the Hudson River, Castle Garden in Jacksonville and Longwood in Natchez, Mississippi usually cited among the more prominent examples. After the American Civil War, Moorish or Turkish smoking rooms achieved some popularity. There were Moorish details in the interiors created for the Henry Osborne Havemeyer residence on Fifth Avenue by Louis Comfort Tiffany. The most thorough example of Moorish Revival architecture was Villa Zorayda in St. Augustine, Florida, built in 1883 by Franklin W. Smith as a winter home and showplace for the Boston businessman and architectural enthusiast. Today it is a museum, open for tourists. In 1893, The Great Saltair was built on the southern shores of The Great Salt Lake, adjacent to Salt Lake City. Beneath dozens of Moorish domes and lambrequin, polylobed, and keyhole arches, Saltair featured an array of attractions, including popular clubs, restaurants, bowling alleys, a hippodrome, rollercoaster and an observation overlooking the vast desert landscape, and it was also home to what promoters claimed was the largest dance hall in the world. Much Like Iranistan before it, Saltair was destroyed by fire in 1925 and again in 1970; the first of which, less than 30 years after opening.

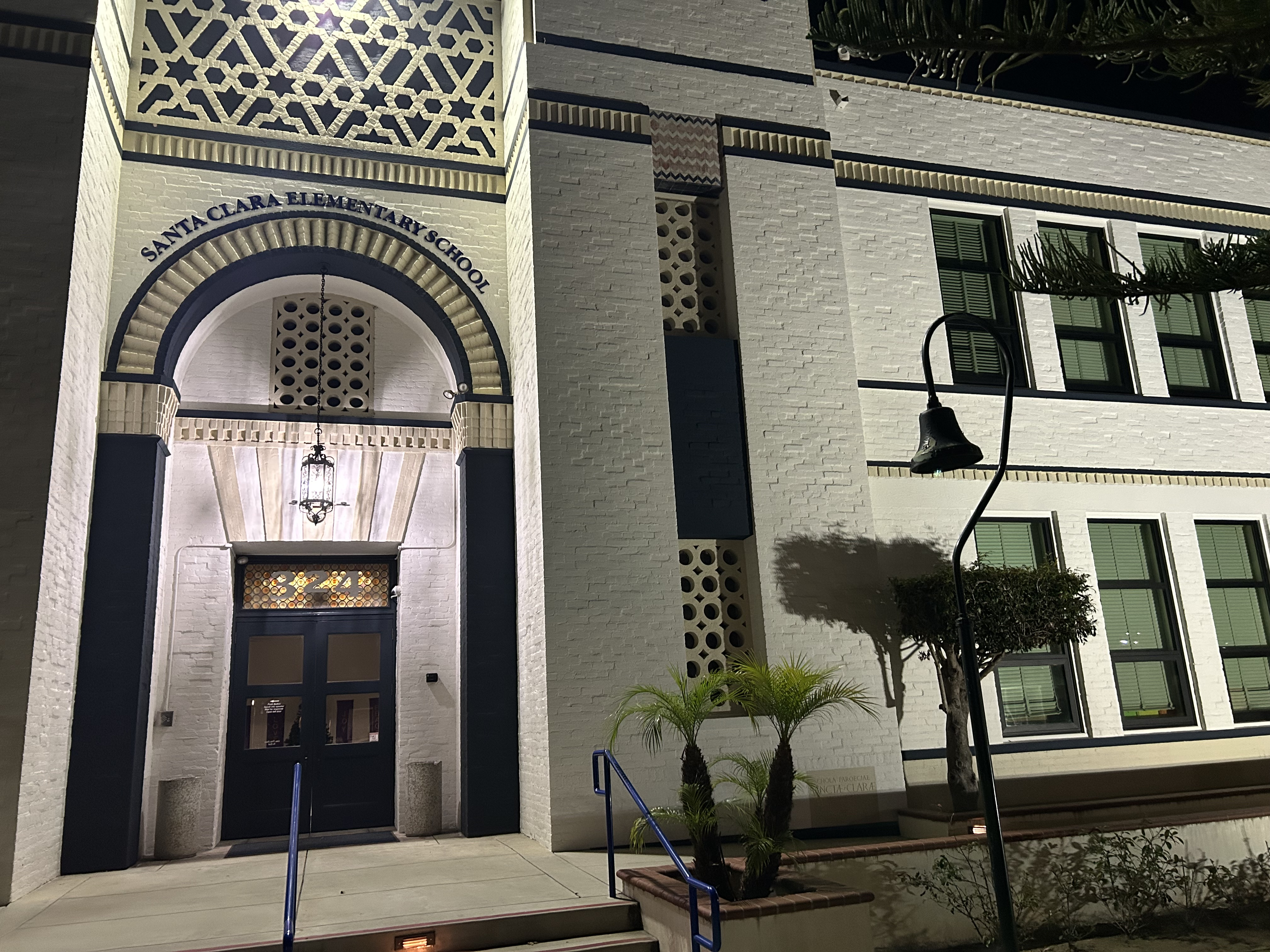
Santa Clara Catholic School with ornate Moorish brickwork in Oxnard, California (1927)

The trend continued into the early 1900s, for example in the 1909 Murat Shrine Temple in Indianapolis, Indiana. The 1914 Pittock Mansion in Portland, Oregon incorporates Turkish design features, as well as French, English, and Italian ones; the smoking room in particular has notable Moorish revival elements. In 1937, the Corn Palace in Mitchell, South Dakota added unusual minarets and Moorish domes, unusual because the polychrome decorations are made out of corn cobs of various colors assembled like mosaic tiles to create patterns. The Corn Palace’s Moorish-style towers and onion-shaped domes were added during the 1937 redesign by architect Emmett A. Angell, who aimed to give the building a more exotic appearance to attract visitors during the Great Depression. The 1891 Tampa Bay Hotel, whose minarets and Moorish domes are now the pride of the University of Tampa, was a particularly extravagant example of the style. Other schools with Moorish Revival buildings include David H. Zysman Hall at Yeshiva University in New York City. George Washington Smith used the style in his design for the 1920s Isham Beach Estate in Santa Barbara, California.

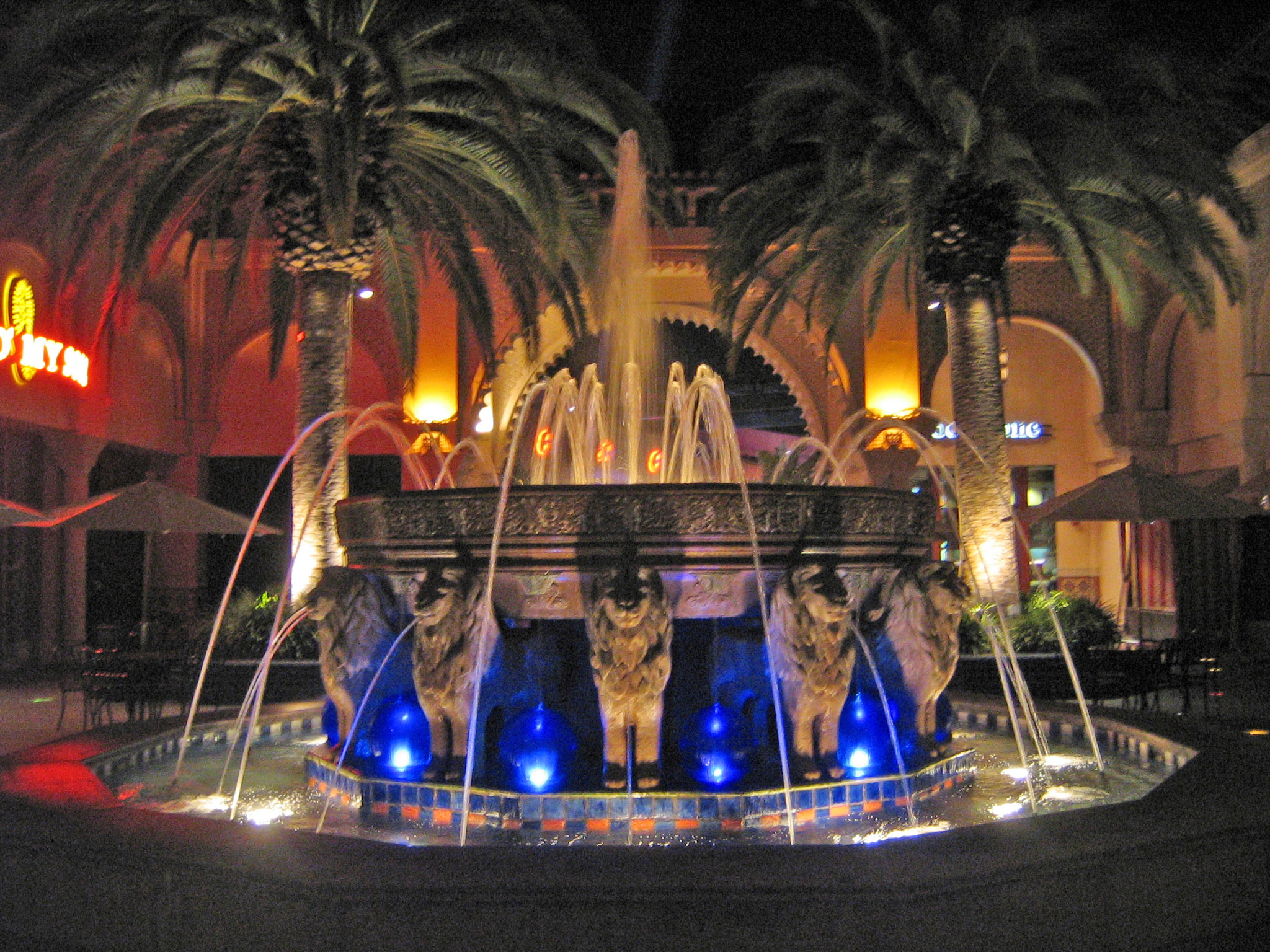
An example of the Andalusi architecture in the Center, a fountain designed after the Alhambra's Court of the Lions

The Irvine Spectrum Center in Irvine, California, also features Moorish-inspired architecture, specifically based on the Alhambra, including stuff like a replica fountain of lions.

== In Latin America ==
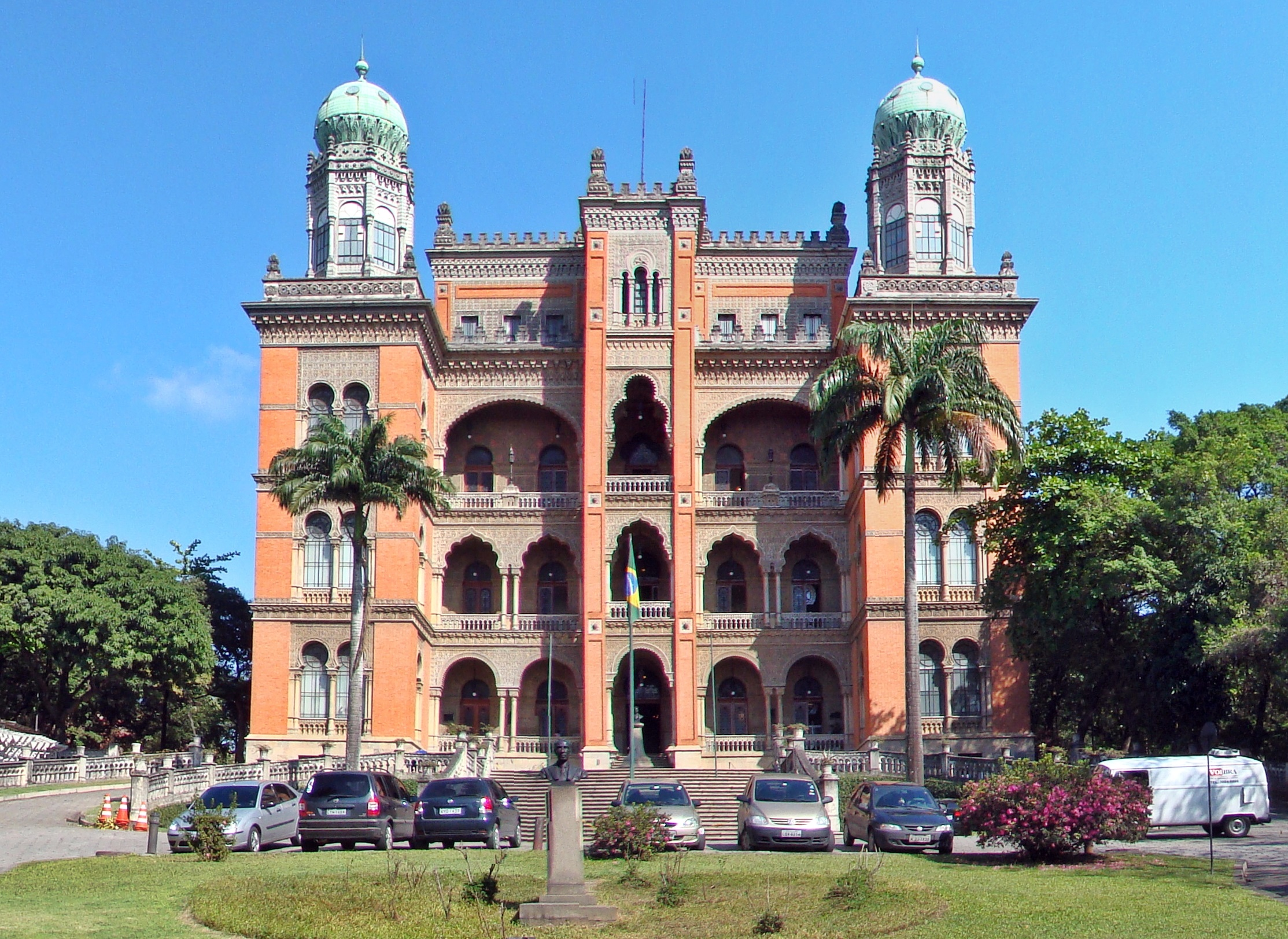
Neo-Moorish façade of the Palace of Manguinhos, site of the Oswaldo Cruz Institute in Rio de Janeiro, Brazil.

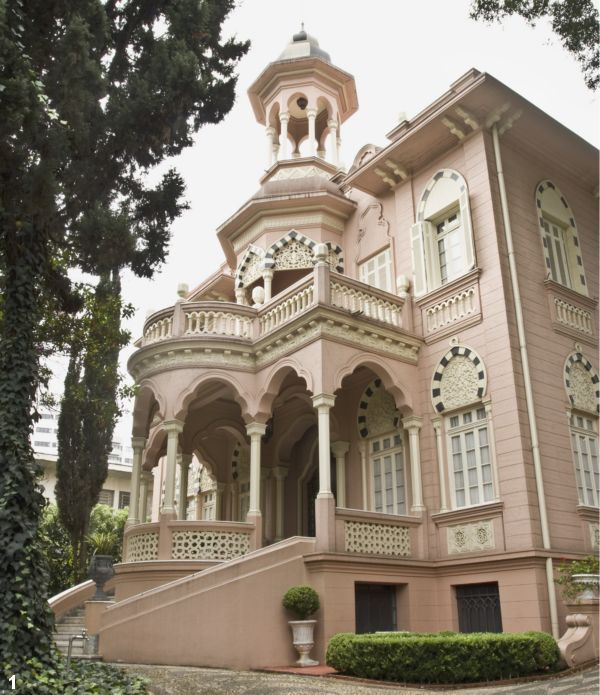
"Palacete Rosa", in São Paulo, Brazil, built by a wealthy family of Lebanese immigrants.

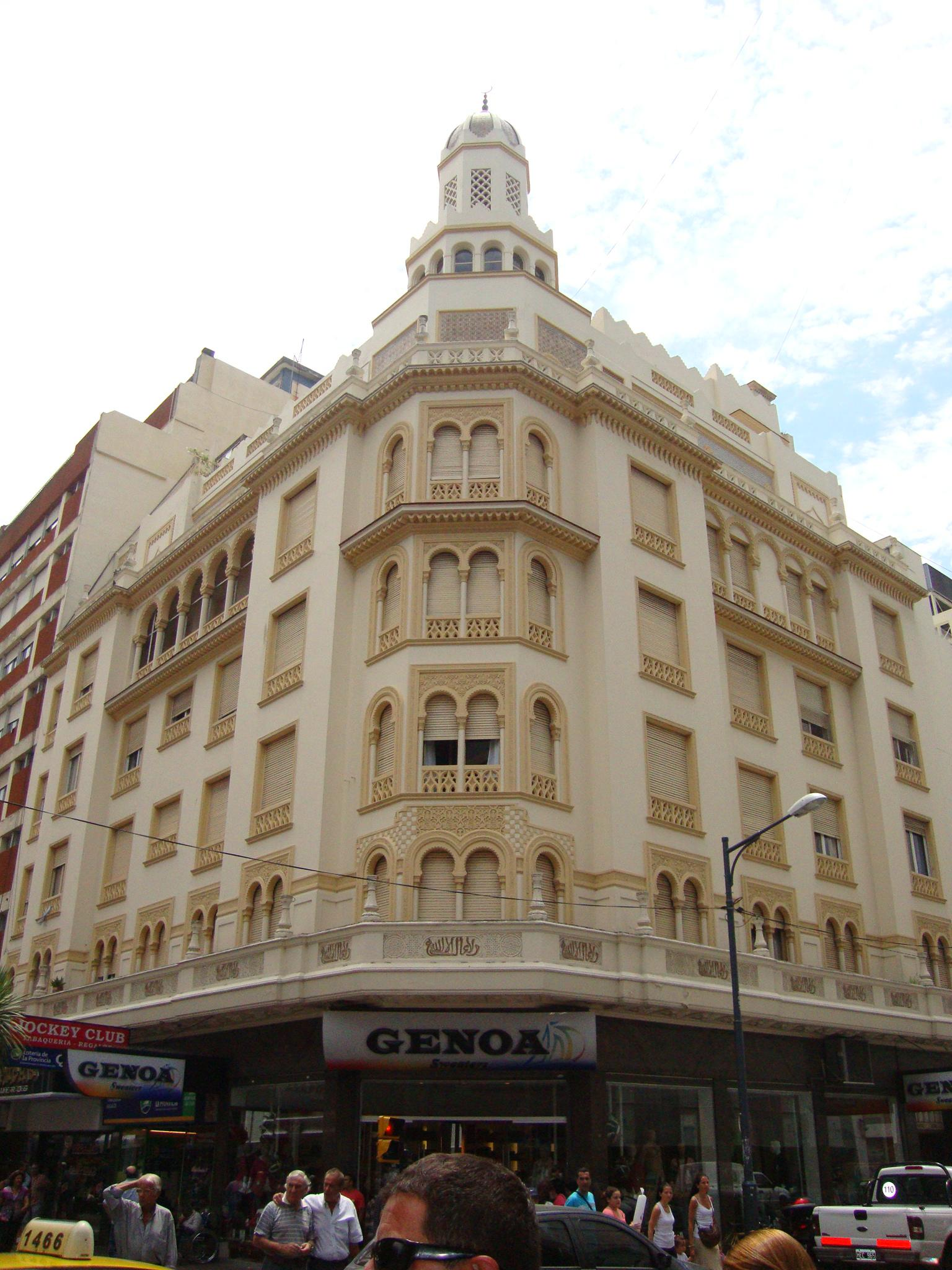
The "Palacio Arabe" was built by Syrian immigrant Jalil Mahmud Hassein with the characteristics of the mudéjar style.

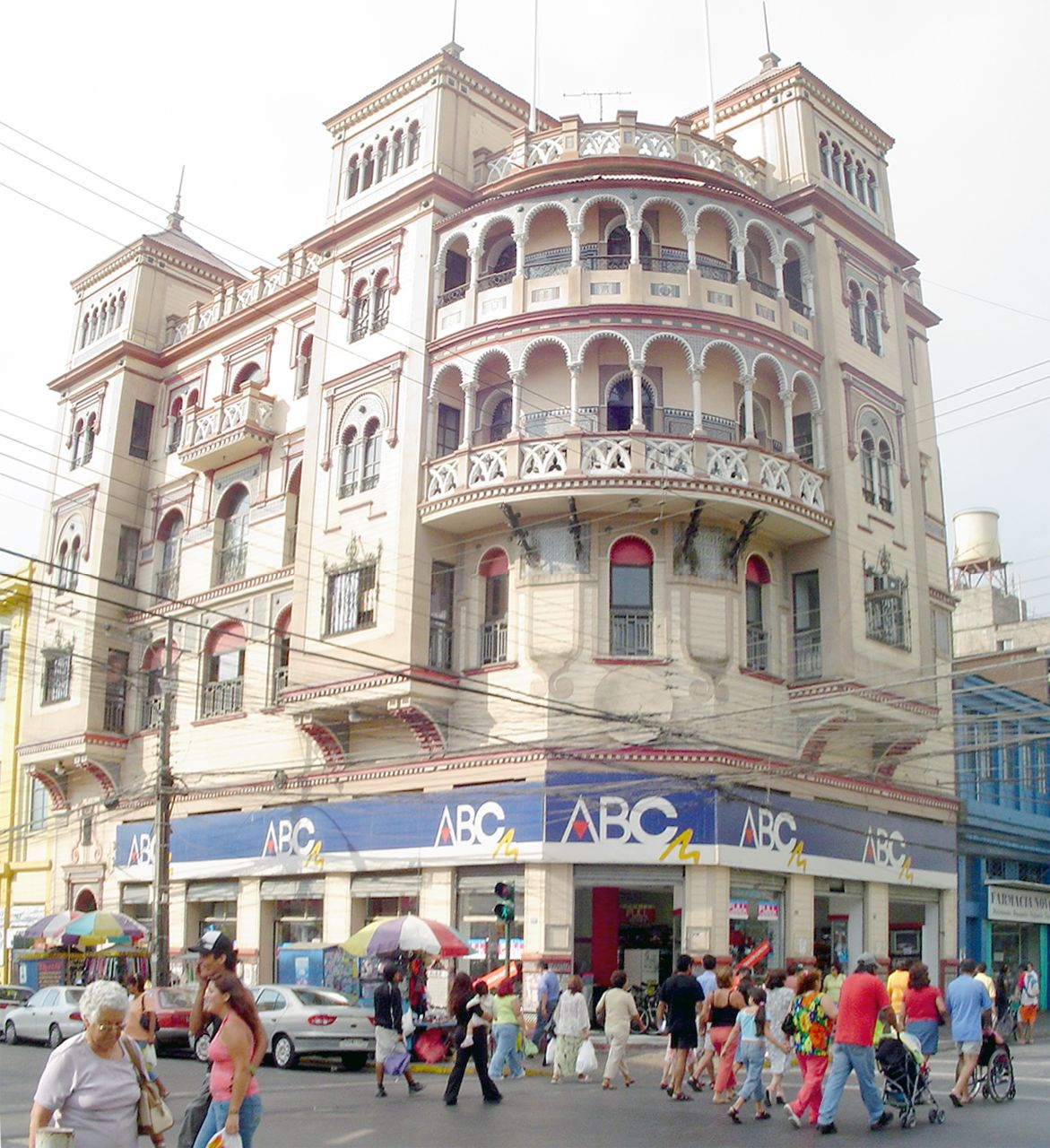
The Casa Giménez It was built by Spanish immigrants Ismael Giménez and Enrique Longueira in Antofagasta (Chile) to function as a residence and business, and was inaugurated in 1924.

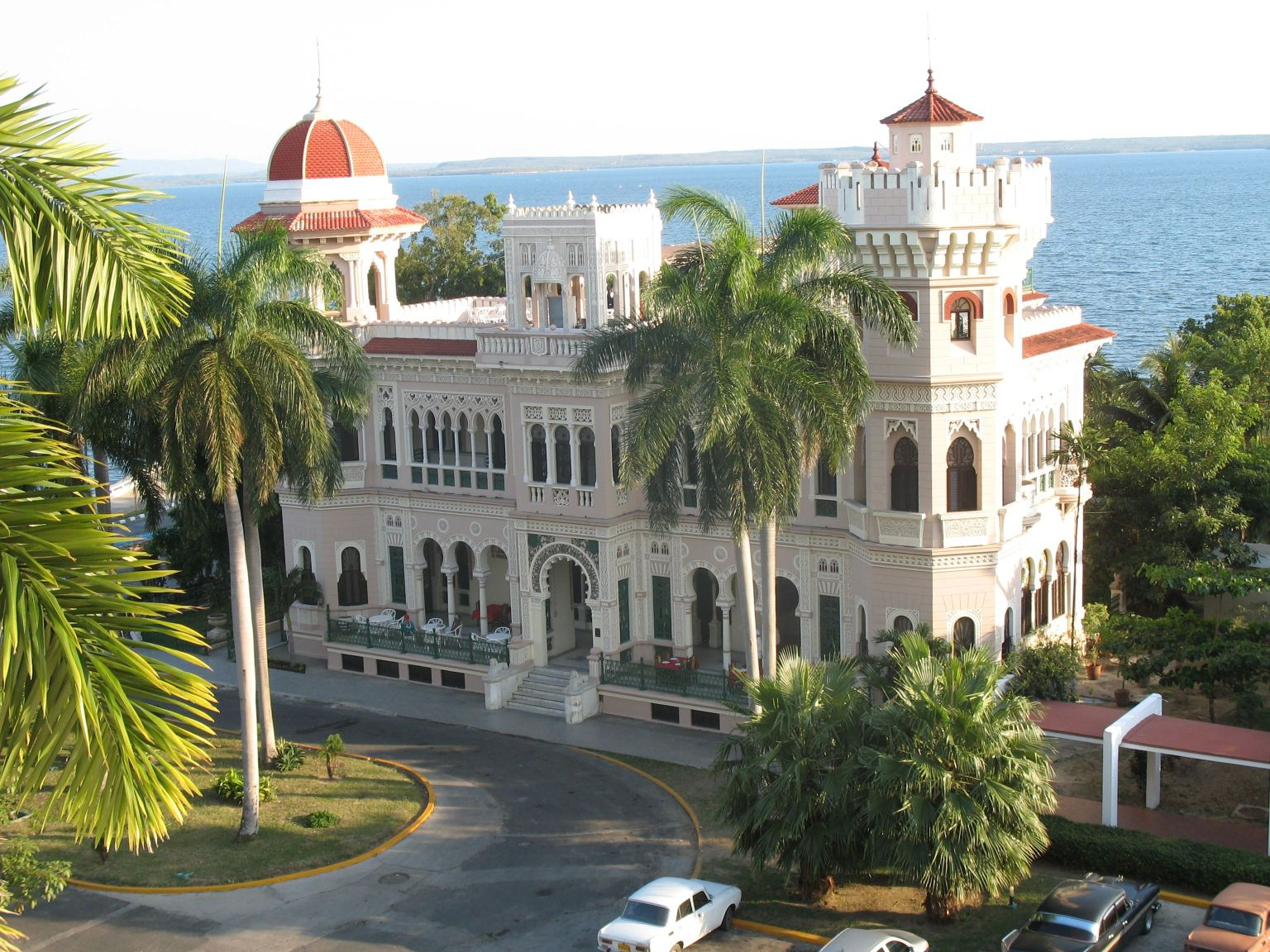
Palacio del Valle in Cienfuegos, Cuba. It was built in 1917 by a Spanish sugar merchant, Acisclo del Valle Blanco.

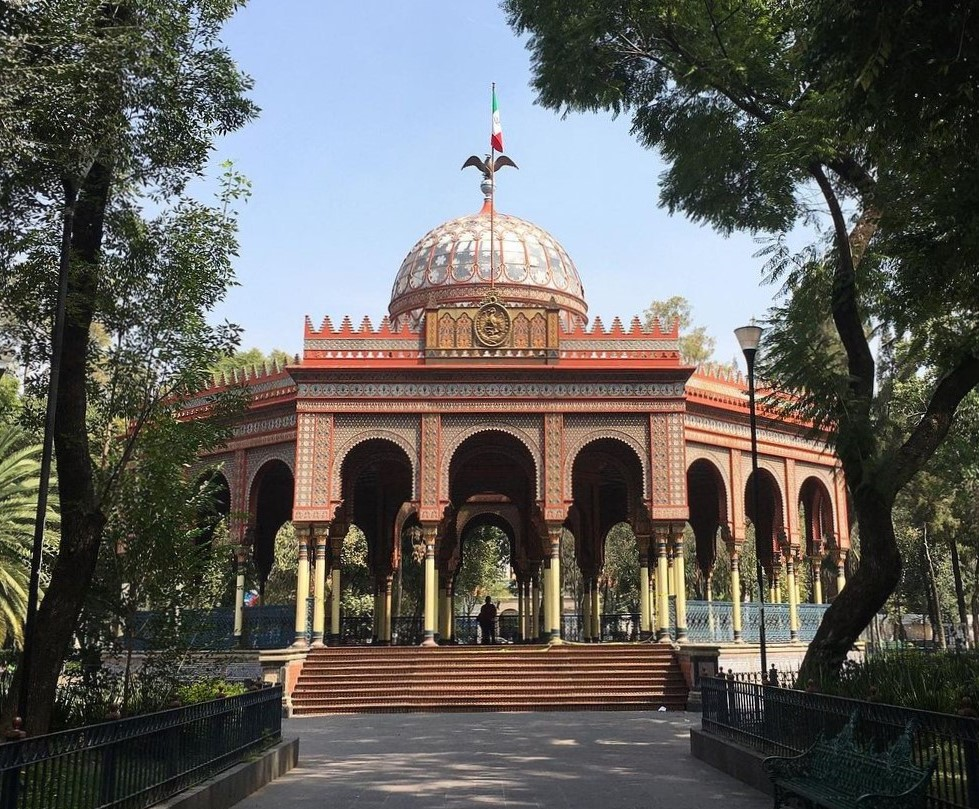
The Morisco Kiosk, in Mexico City was built by José Ramón Ibarrola as the Mexico Pavilion at the 1884 World’s Fair in New Orleans.

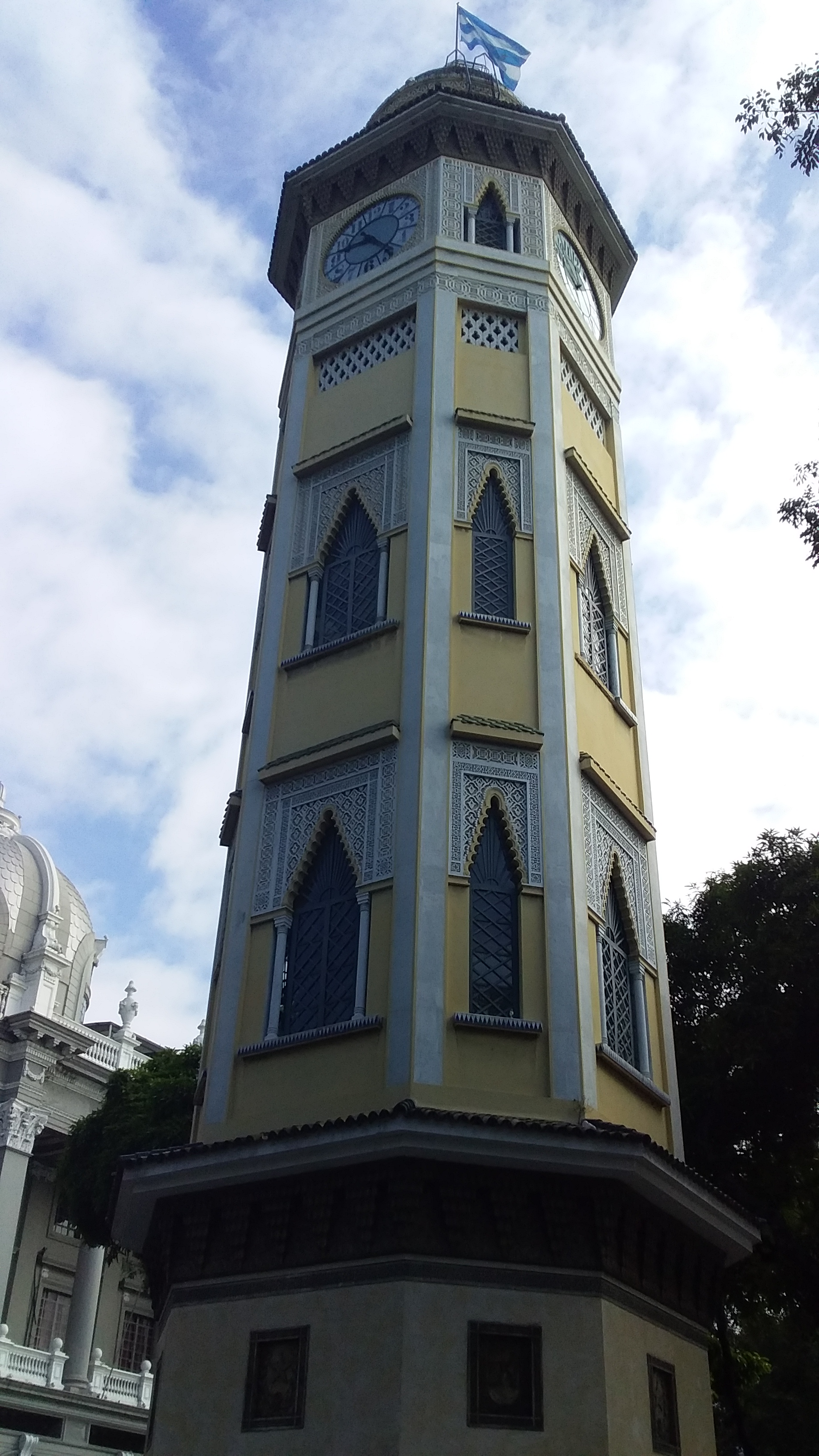
Clock Tower of Guayaquil, in Guayaquil, Ecuador. It was built between 1930 and 1931 by Engineer Francisco Ramón and architect J. Pérez Nin y Landín.

- Palace of Manguinhos, in Rio de Janeiro, Brazil (1918)
- Immaculate Heart of Mary Church, in Méier, Rio de Janeiro, Brazil (1917)
- Pink Mansion, in Ipiranga, São Paulo, Brazil (1927)
- Municipal Market of Campinas, Brazil (1908)
- Lapinha Church, in Salvador, Brazil (1930)
- Morisco Kiosk, in Mexico City, México (1884)
- Palacio de Valle in Cienfuegos, Cuba (1913–17)
- Maestranza César Girón Bullring, in Maracay, Venezuela (1933)
- Castillo Unanue, in San Vicente de Cañete, Peru (1890)
- Moorish Arch, in Lima, Peru (1924)
- Casa Gimenez in Antofagasta, Chile (1924)
- Casino Español in Iquique, Chile (1904)
- Palacio La Alhambra, in Santiago, Chile (1862)
- Palacio Arabe, downtown Mar del Plata, Argentina (1945)
- Moorish Castle, at the top of the hill in Independence Park, in Tandil, Argentina (1923)
- Clock Tower of Guayaquil, in Guayaquil, Ecuador (1930–31)

== In India ==
- Spanish Mosque, built by Viqar-ul-Umra at Hyderabad.

== In Saudi Arabia ==
- Al Rajhi Grand Mosque, built by Sulaiman bin Abdulaziz Al Rajhi in Riyadh in 2004.

== Theaters ==
=== In the United States ===
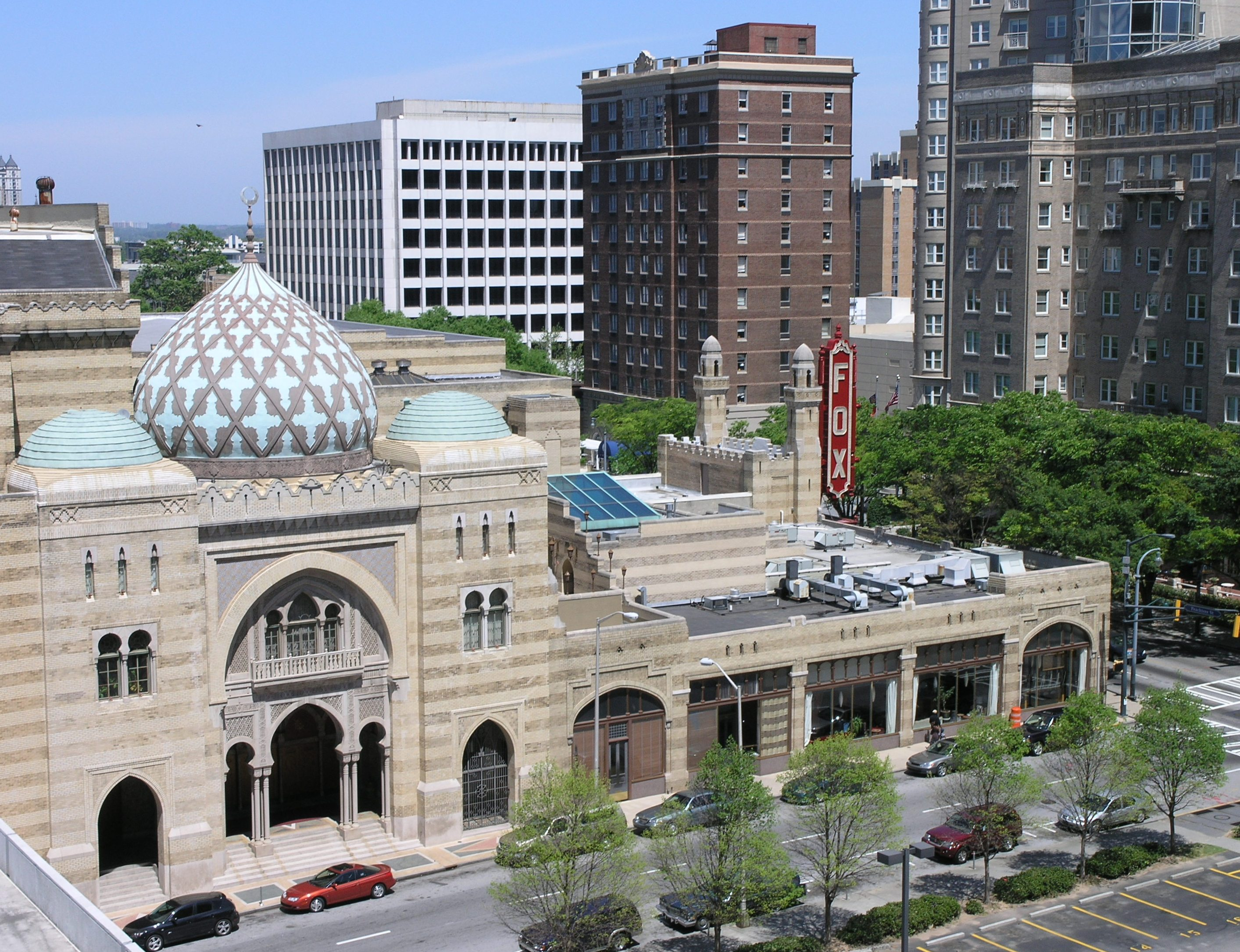
Fox Theatre (Atlanta, Georgia)

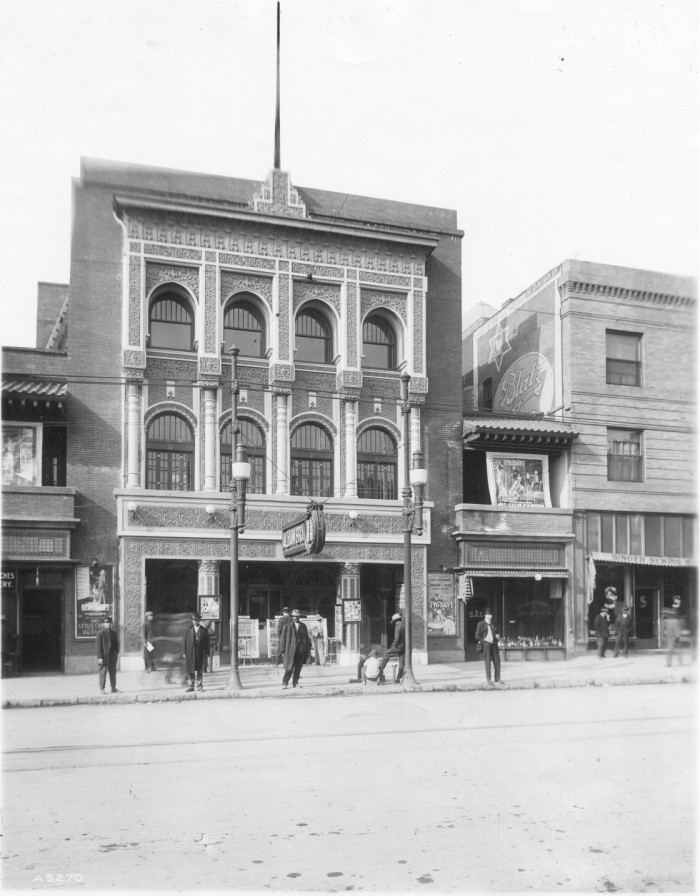
The Alhambra Theatre (El Paso, Texas)

Theater	City and State	Architect	Date
Murat Theatre at Old National Centre	Indianapolis, Indiana	Oscar D. Bohlen	1910
Alhambra Theatre	El Paso, Texas	Henry C. Trost	1914
New York City Center	Manhattan, New York City	Harry P. Knowles and Clinton & Russell	1922
Alhambra Theatre	San Francisco, California	Miller and Pflueger	1925
Olympia Theater	Miami, Florida	John Eberson	1926
Madrid Theatre	Kansas City, Missouri	DeFoe & Besecke	1926
Shrine Auditorium	Los Angeles, California	Lansburgh, Austin and Edelman	1926
Village East Cinema	Manhattan, New York City	Harrison Wiseman; Willy Pogany (interior)	1926
Altria Theater	Richmond, Virginia	Marcellus E. Wright Sr., Charles M. Robinson	1927
Bagdad Theatre	Portland, Oregon	Thomas & Mercier	1927
Mount Baker Theatre	Bellingham, Washington	Robert Reamer	1927
Lincoln Theater	Los Angeles, California	John Paxton Perrine	1927
Keith's Flushing Theater	Queens, New York	Thomas Lamb	1928
The Carpenter Center	Richmond, Virginia	John Eberson	1928
Civic Theatre	Akron, Ohio	John Eberson	1929
Emporia Granada Theatre	Emporia, Kansas	Boller Brothers	1929
Fox Theatre	Atlanta, Georgia	Mayre, Alger & Vinour	1929
Granada Theater	The Dalles, Oregon	William Cutts	1929
The Majestic Theatre	San Antonio, Texas	John Eberson	1929
Music Box Theatre	Chicago, Illinois	Louis J. Simon	1929
Paramount Theater	Abilene, Texas	David S. Castle & Co.	1930
Plaza Theatre	El Paso, Texas	W. Scott Donne	1930

=== Around the world ===
Theater	Photo	City and State	Country	Architect	Date
Tbilisi Opera and Ballet Theatre		Tbilisi	Georgia	Victor schröter	1851, rebuilt 1896
Bains Dunkerquois		Dunkerque	France	Louis Gilquin	1896
Odesa Philharmonic Theater		Odesa	Ukraine	Alexander Bernardazzi	1898
State/Forum Theatre		Melbourne, Victoria	Australia	Bohringer, Taylor & Johnson	1929
Civic Theatre		Auckland	New Zealand	Charles Bohringer and William T. Leighton	1929

== Synagogues ==
=== Europe ===
- Munich synagogue, by Friedrich von Gärtner, 1832 was the earliest Moorish revival synagogue (destroyed on Kristallnacht)
- Semper Synagogue, by Gottfried Semper, Dresden, 1839–1840 (destroyed on Kristallnacht)
- Leopoldstädter Tempel, Vienna, Austria, 1853–1858 (destroyed on Kristallnacht)
- Dohány Street Synagogue, Budapest, Hungary, 1854–1859
- Leipzig synagogue, 1855 (in the Gottschedstrasse, destroyed on Kristallnacht in 1938)
- Glockengasse synagogue, Cologne, Germany, 1855–1861 (destroyed on Kristallnacht)
- New Synagogue by Eduard Knoblauch, Berlin, 1859–1866
- New Synagogue, Ostrów Wielkopolski, Poland, 1857–1860
- Tempel Synagogue, Cracow, Poland, 1860–1862
- Cetate Synagogue, Timişoara, Romania, by Ignaz Schumann, 1864–1865
- Choral Temple, Bucharest, 1864–1866
- Zagreb Synagogue, 1867
- The Great Synagogue of Stockholm, Sweden, by Fredrik Wilhelm Scholander, 1867–1870
- Synagogue of Besançon, France, 1867–1870
- Spanish Synagogue, Prague, Czech Republic, 1868
- Rumbach Street synagogue, Budapest, Hungary, 1872
- Czernowitz Synagogue, Chernivtsi, Ukraine, 1873
- Great Synagogue of Florence, Tempio Maggiore, Florence, Italy, 1874–1882
- Princes Road Synagogue, Liverpool, England, 1874
- Manchester Jewish Museum, built as a Sephardic synagogue, Manchester, England, 1874
- Vercelli Synagogue, Vercelli, Italy, 1878
- Vrbové synagogue, Vrbové, Slovakia, 1883
- Turin synagogue, Italy, 1884
- Synagoge Zürich Löwenstrasse, Switzerland, 1884
- Great Synagogue in Plzeň, Plzeň, Czech Republic, 1888
- The Grand Choral Synagogue, Saint Petersburg, Russia, 1888
- Esztergom Synagogue, Hungary, 1888
- Fabric New Synagogue in Timişoara, Romania, by Lipot Baumhorn, 1889
- La Ferté-sous-Jouarre synagogue, France, 1891
- Hollandse Synagoge, Antwerp, Belgium, 1893
- Second Luxembourg Synagogue, Luxembourg City, Luxembourg, 1894
- Great Choral Synagogue (Kyiv), Ukraine, 1895
- Opava synagogue, Czech Republic, 1895
- Olomouc Synagogue, Olomouc, Czech Republic, 1897 (destroyed in 1938)
- Malacky synagogue, Slovakia, 1886, rebuilt 1900
- Sarajevo Synagogue, 1902
- Karaite Kenesa, Kyiv, Ukraine, 1902
- Jubilee Synagogue, Prague, Czech Republic, 1906
- Bet Israel Synagogue, Belgrade, Serbia, 1908
- Sofia Synagogue, Sofia, Bulgaria, 1909
- Galitska Synagogue, Kyiv, Ukraine, 1909
- Uzhhorod Synagogue, Uzhhorod, Ukraine, 1910
- Chișinău Choral Synagogue, Moldova, 1913

=== United States ===
- Isaac M. Wise Temple, also known as the Plum Street Temple, Cincinnati, Ohio, 1865
- Congregation Rodeph Shalom, Philadelphia, 1866 (no longer standing)
- Temple Emanu-El on Fifth Avenue at 43rd Street, Congregation Emanu-El of the City of New York built in 1868, designed by Leopold Eidlitz, assisted by Henry Fernbach, (no longer standing)
- B'nai Sholom Temple, Quincy, Illinois, 1870
- Central Synagogue, Upper East Side, Manhattan, New York, 1872
- Charter Oak Temple (Congregation Beth Israel), Hartford, Connecticut, 1876
- Temple of Israel, Wilmington, North Carolina, 1876
- B'nai Israel Synagogue (Baltimore), Maryland, 1876
- Temple Adath Israel, Owensboro, Kentucky, 1877
- Prince Street Synagogue (Oheb Shalom,) Newark, New Jersey, 1884
- Eldridge Street Synagogue, Lower East Side, Manhattan, New York, 1887
- Congregation Beth Israel of Portland, Oregon, 1888 (no longer standing)
- Park East Synagogue, Upper East Side, Manhattan, New York, 1889
- Gemiluth Chessed, Port Gibson, Mississippi, 1891
- Temple Emanu-El (Helena, Montana), 1891
- Temple Beth-El, Corsicana, Corsicana, Navarro County, Texas, 1898–1900
- Temple Sinai (Sumter, South Carolina), 1912
- Young Israel of Flatbush, Midwood, Brooklyn, 1923
- Congregation Ohab Zedek, Upper West Side, Manhattan, New York, 1926
- Congregation Rodeph Shalom, Philadelphia, 1928
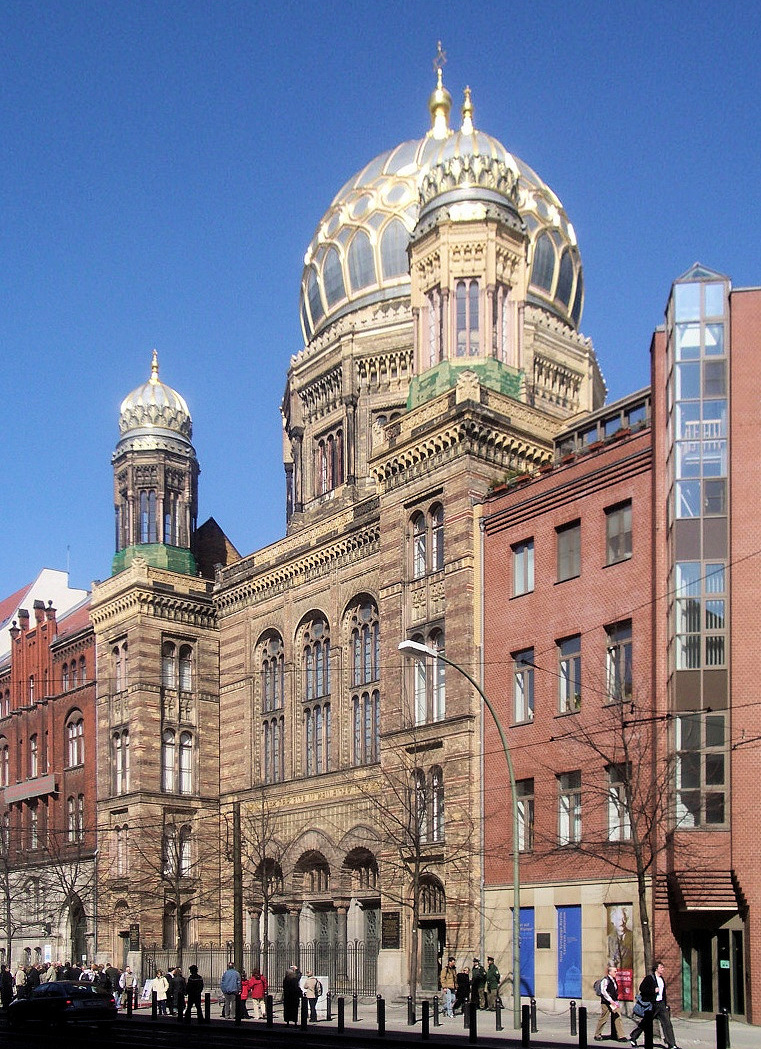
New Synagogue, Berlin, Germany

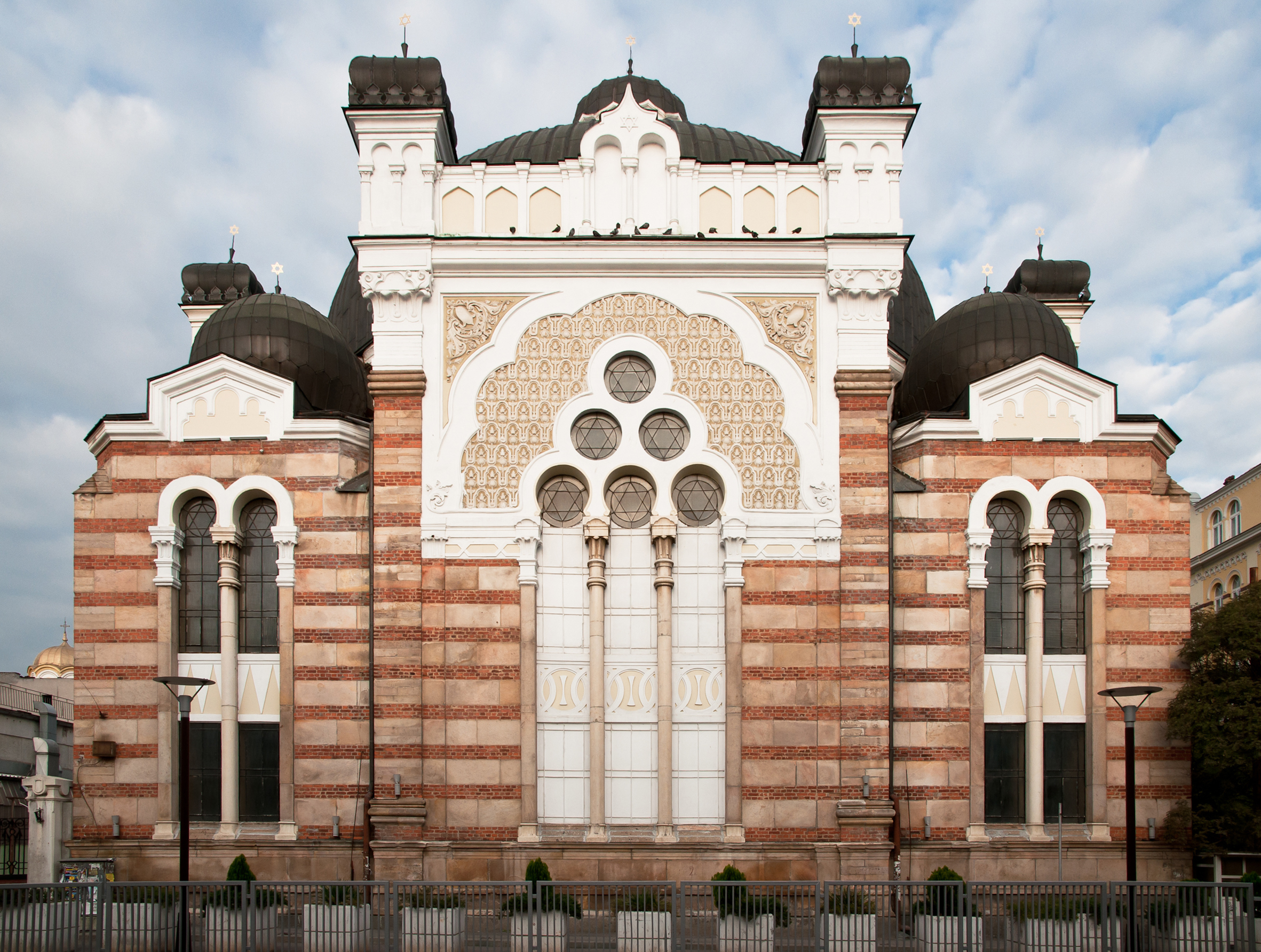
Sofia Synagogue, Sofia, Bulgaria

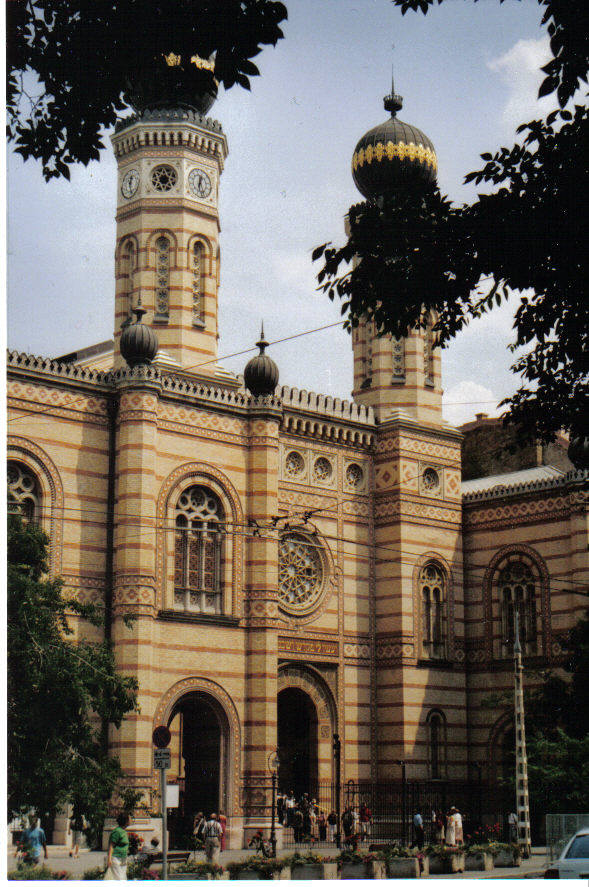
Dohány Street Synagogue, Budapest, Hungary

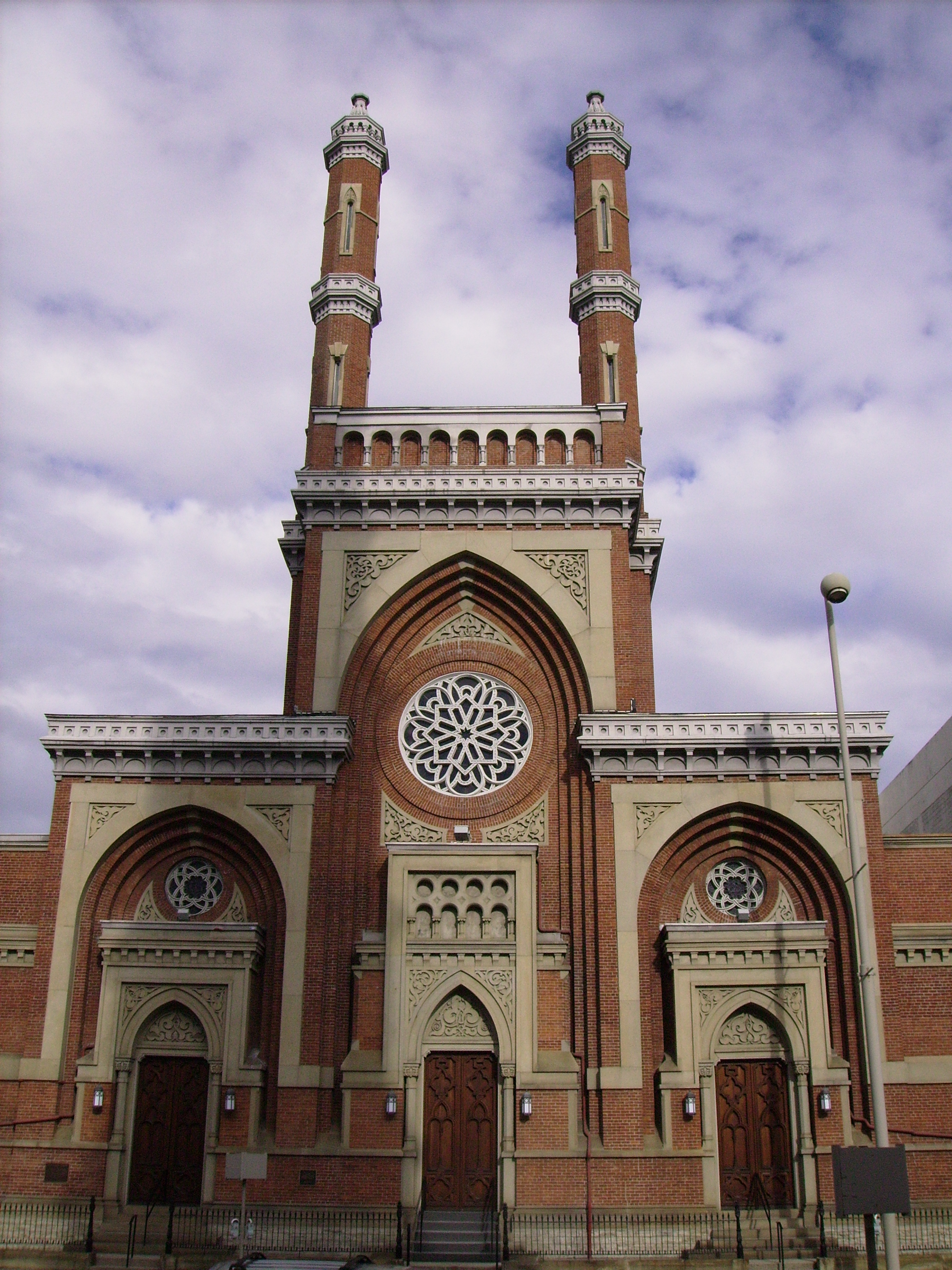
Isaac M. Wise Temple, Cincinnati, Ohio

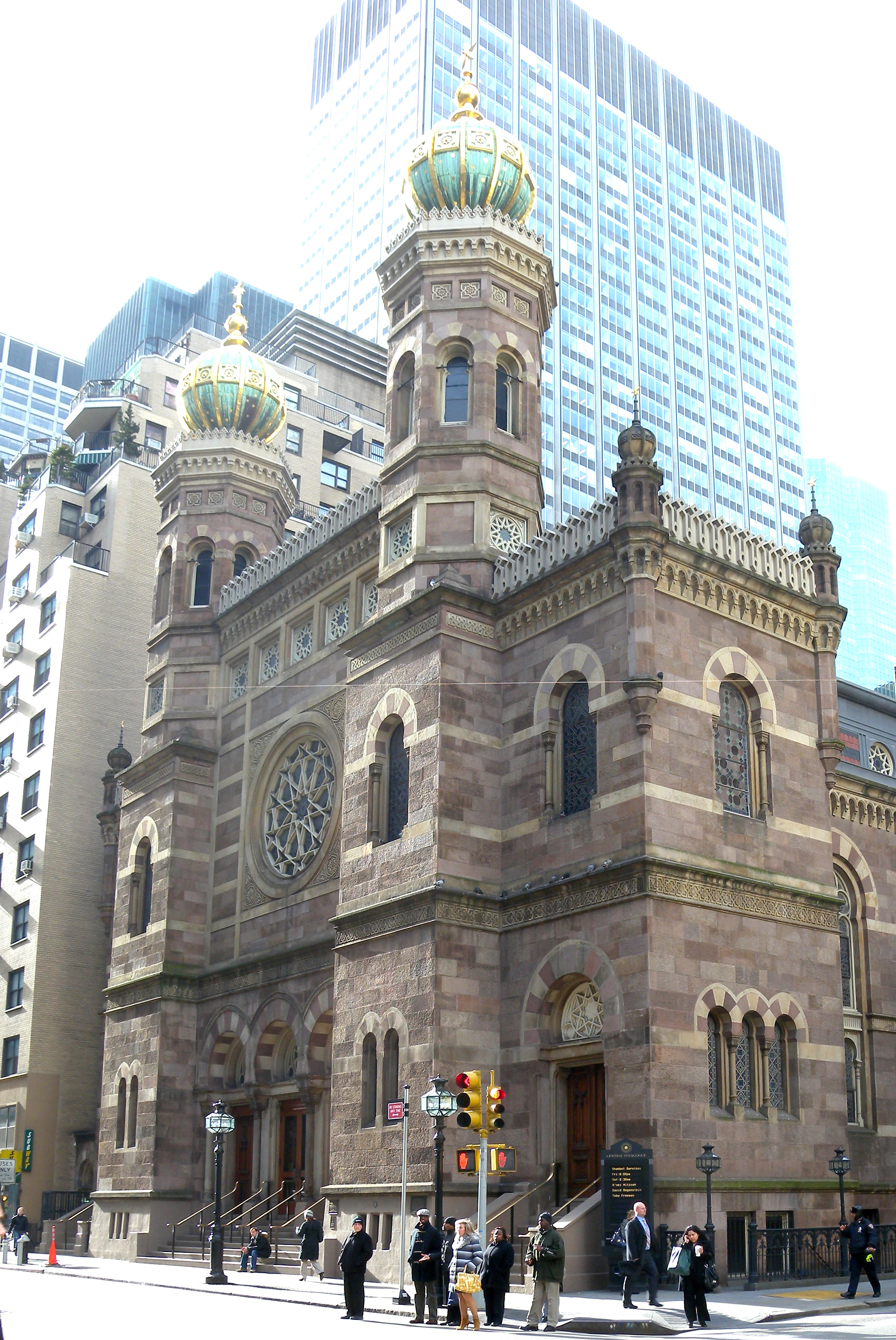
Central Synagogue in New York City

== Churches and cathedrals ==
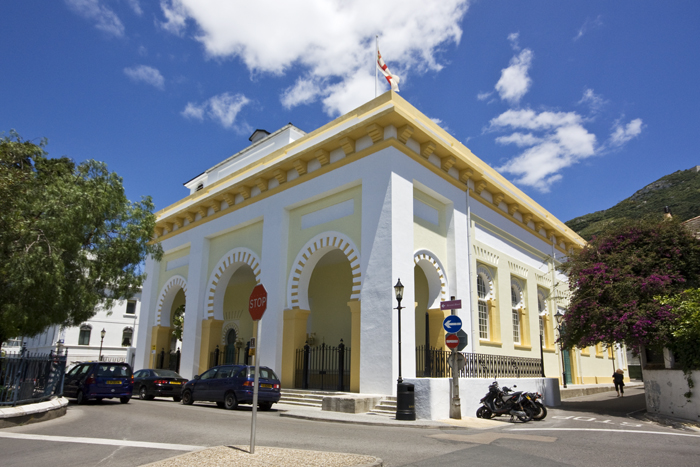
Cathedral of the Holy Trinity, Gibraltar

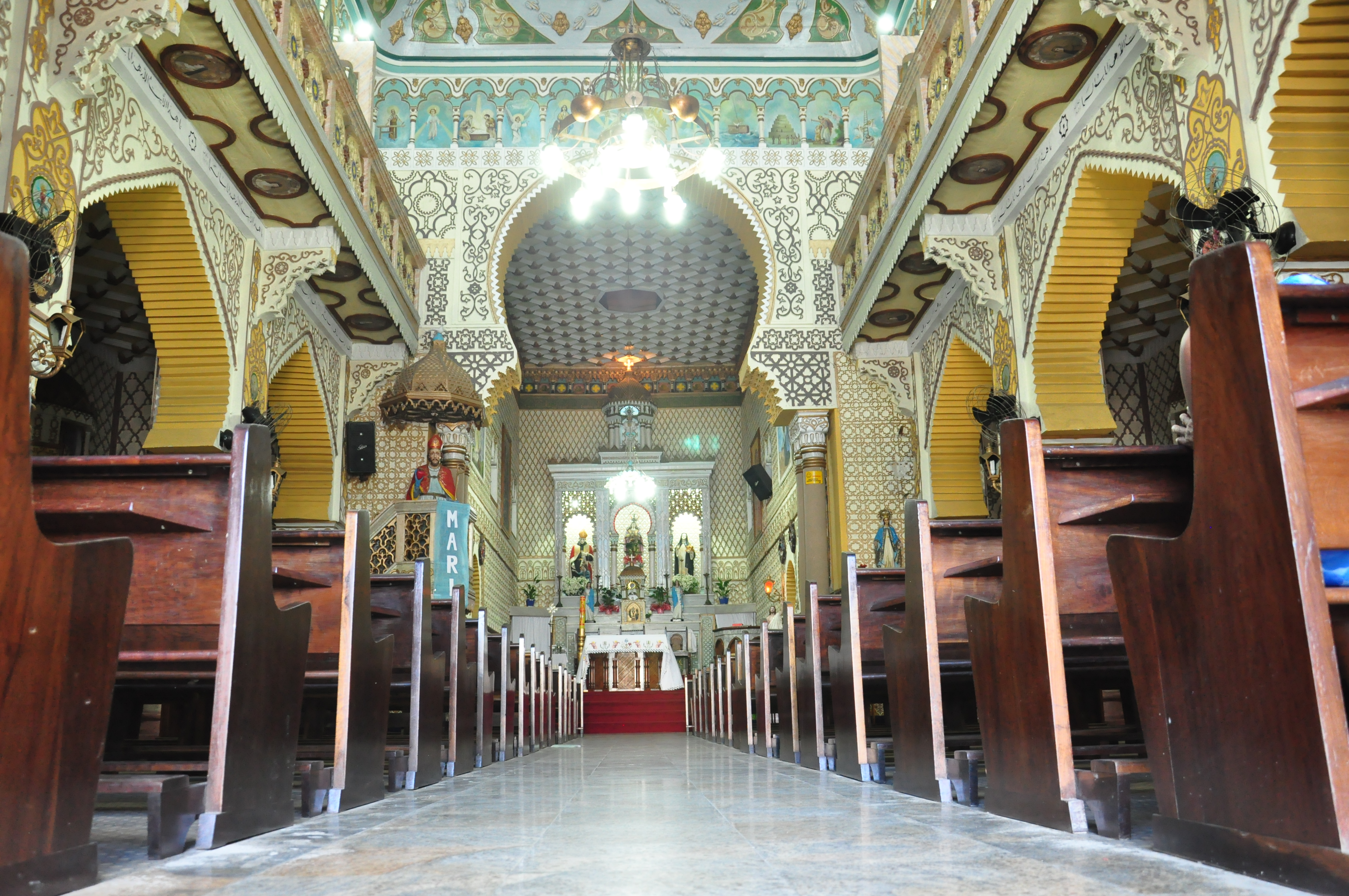
Lapinha Church, in Salvador, Brazil (1930)

- The Cathedral of the Holy Trinity, Gibraltar (1825–1832) an early example of Moorish revival architecture is located in Gibraltar, which formed part of Moorish Al-Andalus between 711 and 1462 AD.
- Immaculate Conception Church (New Orleans), (a.k.a. Jesuit Church) is a striking example of Moorish Revival Architecture. Across the street was the College of the Immaculate Conception, housing a chapel with two stained glass domes. The chapel was disassembled and about half of it (one of the stained glass domes, eleven of the windows) was installed in the present Jesuit High School.
- St Andrew's Church, is an Anglican church in Tangier, Morocco. Consecrated in 1905, the church is within the Archdeaconry of Gibraltar. The building is constructed in a Moorish revival architectural style.

== Shrines and temples ==
The Shriners, a fraternal organization, often chose a Moorish Revival style for their Temples. Architecturally notable Shriners Temples include:

- Acca Temple Shrine, Richmond, Virginia, currently Altria Theater, formerly 'The Landmark Theater' and 'The Mosque'
- Algeria Shrine Temple, Helena, Montana
- Almas Temple, Washington D.C.
- El Zaribah Shrine Auditorium, Phoenix, Arizona
- Jaffa Shrine Center, Altoona, Pennsylvania
- Medinah Temple, Chicago, Illinois now a Bloomingdale's.
- Murat Shrine, Indianapolis, Indiana, the largest Shrine temple in North America, now officially known as Old National Centre.
- New York City Center, now used as a concert hall
- Shrine Auditorium, Los Angeles, California
- Tripoli Shrine Temple, Milwaukee, Wisconsin
- Zembo Mosque, a Masonic Temple in Harrisburg, Pennsylvania
- The Scottish Rite Temple in Santa Fe, New Mexico, while not a Shrine Temple, is a Masonic building that uses the Moorish Revival architectural style.
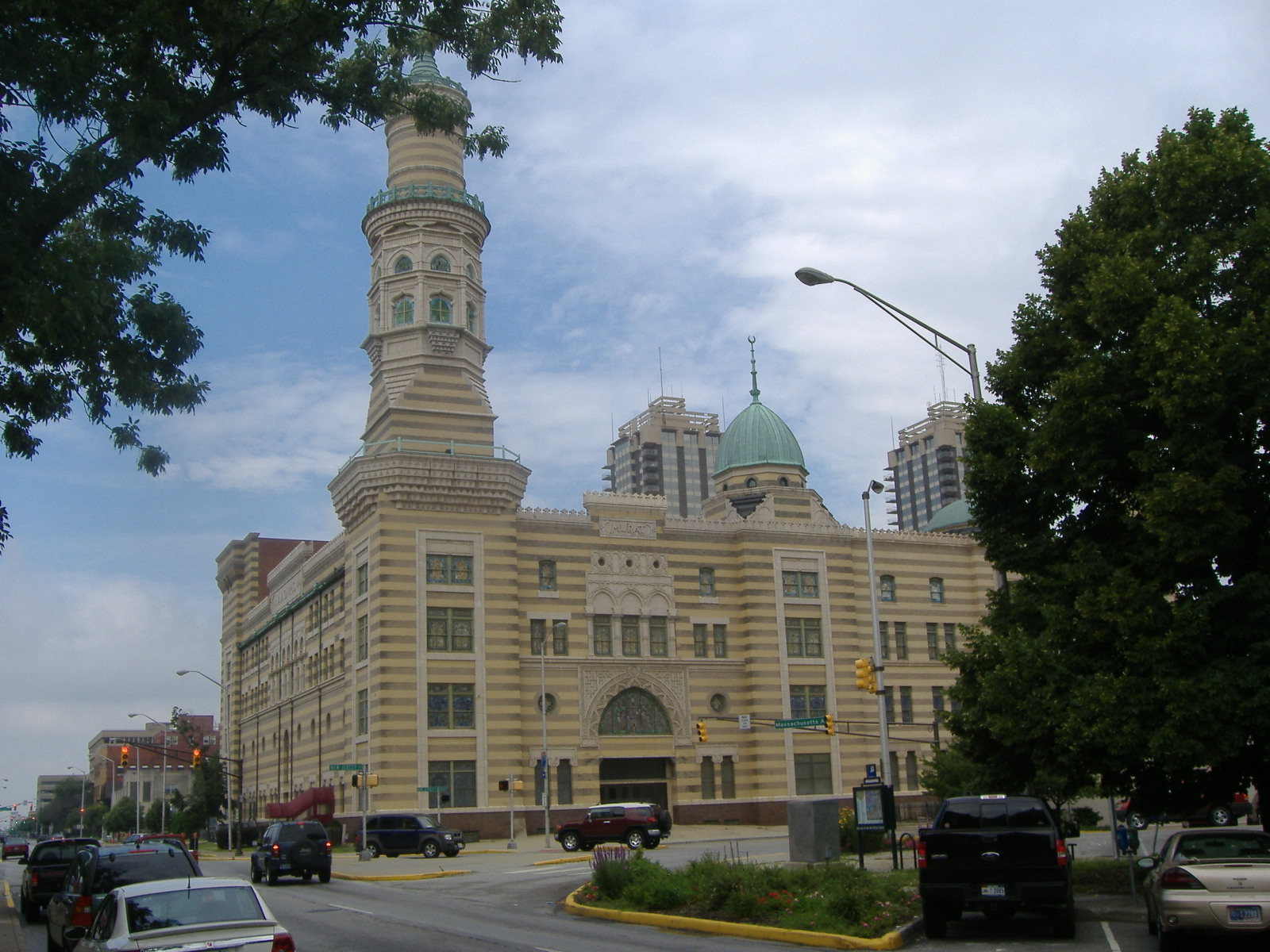
Murat Shrine, Indianapolis, Indiana

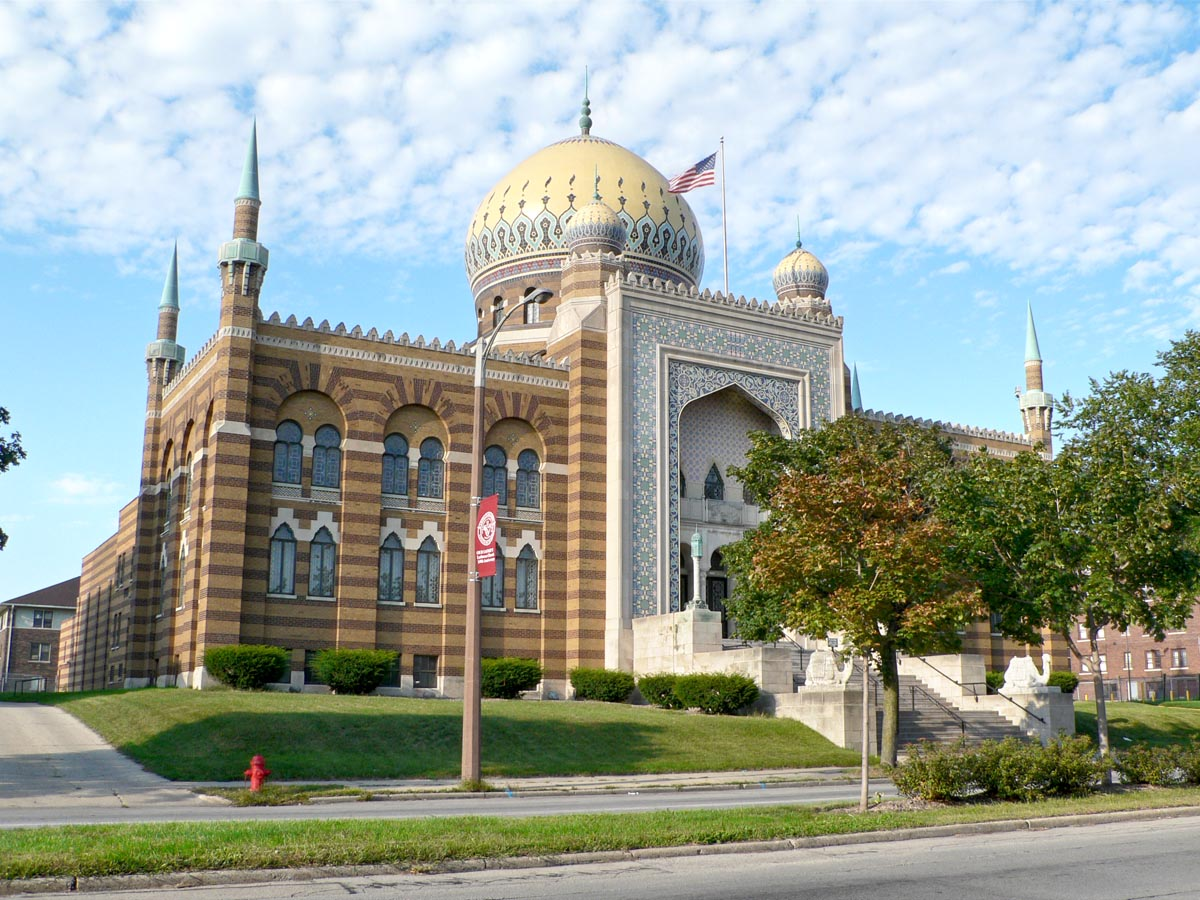
Tripoli Shrine Temple, Milwaukee, Wisconsin

== Other buildings ==
- The Zacherlfabrik, Vienna, 1892
- City hall, Sarajevo, Bosnia and Herzegovina, 1894
- Mostar Gymnasium, Mostar, Bosnia and Herzegovina, 1902
- Former Yenidze Cigarette Factory, Dresden, Germany, 1908 (here, the "minarets" are used to disguise smokestacks)
- Gedung Sate, Bandung, Indonesia, 1924
- Casamaures, Saint-Martin-le-Vinoux, France, 1855
- Villa Zorayda, St. Augustine, FL, 1883
- Campo Pequeno bullring, Lisbon, 1892
- Henry B. Plant Museum, Tampa, FL, 1891
- Atwater water treatment plant, Canal de l'Aqueduc, Montreal, QC, 1912–18
- Scroll and Key Hall (Yale senior society building, New Haven, CT; 1869 and 1901)
- The Citadel, a military college in Charleston, South Carolina

== See also ==
- Moorish Revival architecture in Bosnia and Herzegovina
- Islamic architecture
- Indo-Saracenic Revival architecture

== Sources ==
- Naylor, David (1987). Great American Movie Theaters. Washington, D.C.: The Preservation Press. ISBN 9780891331278.
- Thorne, Ross (1976). Picture Palace Architecture in Australia. South Melbourne, Australia: Sun Books Pty. Ltd. ISBN 072510225X.
