= Etan Mintz =

Modern Orthodox rabbi in Baltimore, Maryland

Rabbi Etan Mintz

Personal life
- Spouse: Tammy Mintz
- Children: 6
- Education: Rabbi Isaac Elchanan Theological Seminary; Bernard Revel Graduate School of Jewish Studies; Harvard Kennedy School (MPA)
- Occupation: Rabbi, activist, writer, educator

Religious life
- Religion: Judaism
- Denomination: Modern Orthodox

Jewish leader
- Position: Rabbi
- Synagogue: B'nai Israel Synagogue
- Residence: Baltimore, Maryland, U.S.
- Semikhah: Rabbi Isaac Elchanan Theological Seminary

Etan Mintz is an American rabbi, activist, writer, and the spiritual leader of the historic B'nai Israel Synagogue (Baltimore) of Baltimore, the oldest continually active synagogue in Maryland and one of the oldest standing synagogues in America. Mintz is an active proponent of Jewish inclusivity. He is a nationally sought speaker, writer, and educator. In response to the 2015 Baltimore protests after the shooting of Freddie Gray, Mintz led a multiracial, interfaith group of clergy to increase community cooperation in Baltimore. Rabbi Mintz has advocated for strengthening racial relations and has advocated for a more welcoming and inclusive vision of Modern Orthodox Judaism.

Mintz received his rabbinical ordination from the Rabbi Isaac Elchanan Theological Seminary at Yeshiva University, and studied for two years at Yeshivat Sha'alavim in Israel. He also holds an M.P.A. degree from the Kennedy School at Harvard University and a master's degree in Jewish Philosophy and Mysticism from the Bernard Revel Graduate School of Jewish Studies. Before becoming the rabbi of B'nai Israel, he was an associate rabbi at the Hebrew Institute in Riverdale, NY, under the leadership of Rabbi Avi Weiss. He taught at the Charles E. Smith Jewish Day School in Rockville, Maryland, and has served as a rabbi during the summer months at The Hampton Synagogue in Westhampton Beach, New York. He has also served on the Bioethics Committee of Johns Hopkins University.

He lives in Baltimore with his wife, Dr. Tammy Mintz, and their six children.
