= Casamaures =

Villa in Saint-Martin-le-Vinoux, France

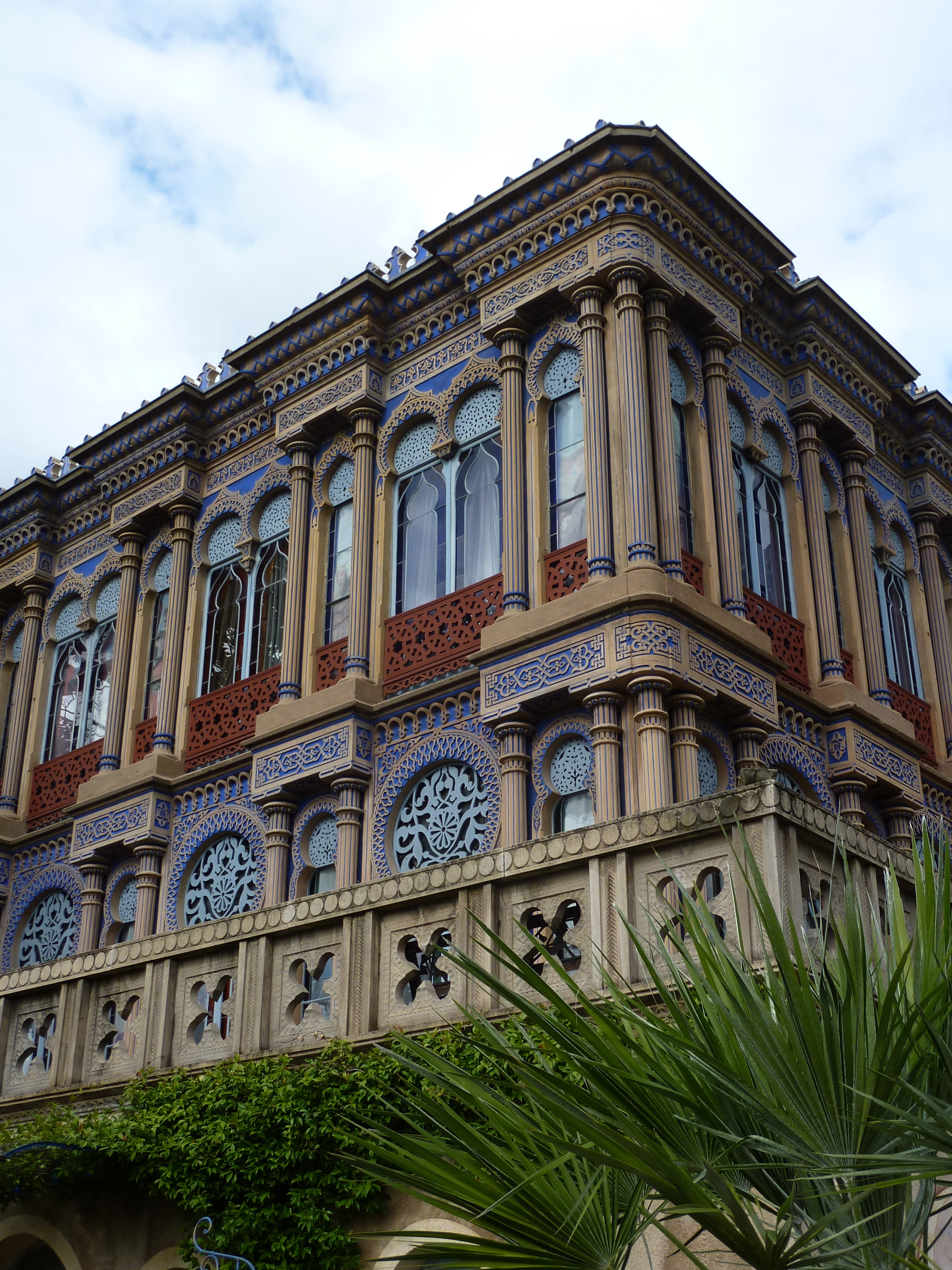
Moorish Revival style La Casamaures

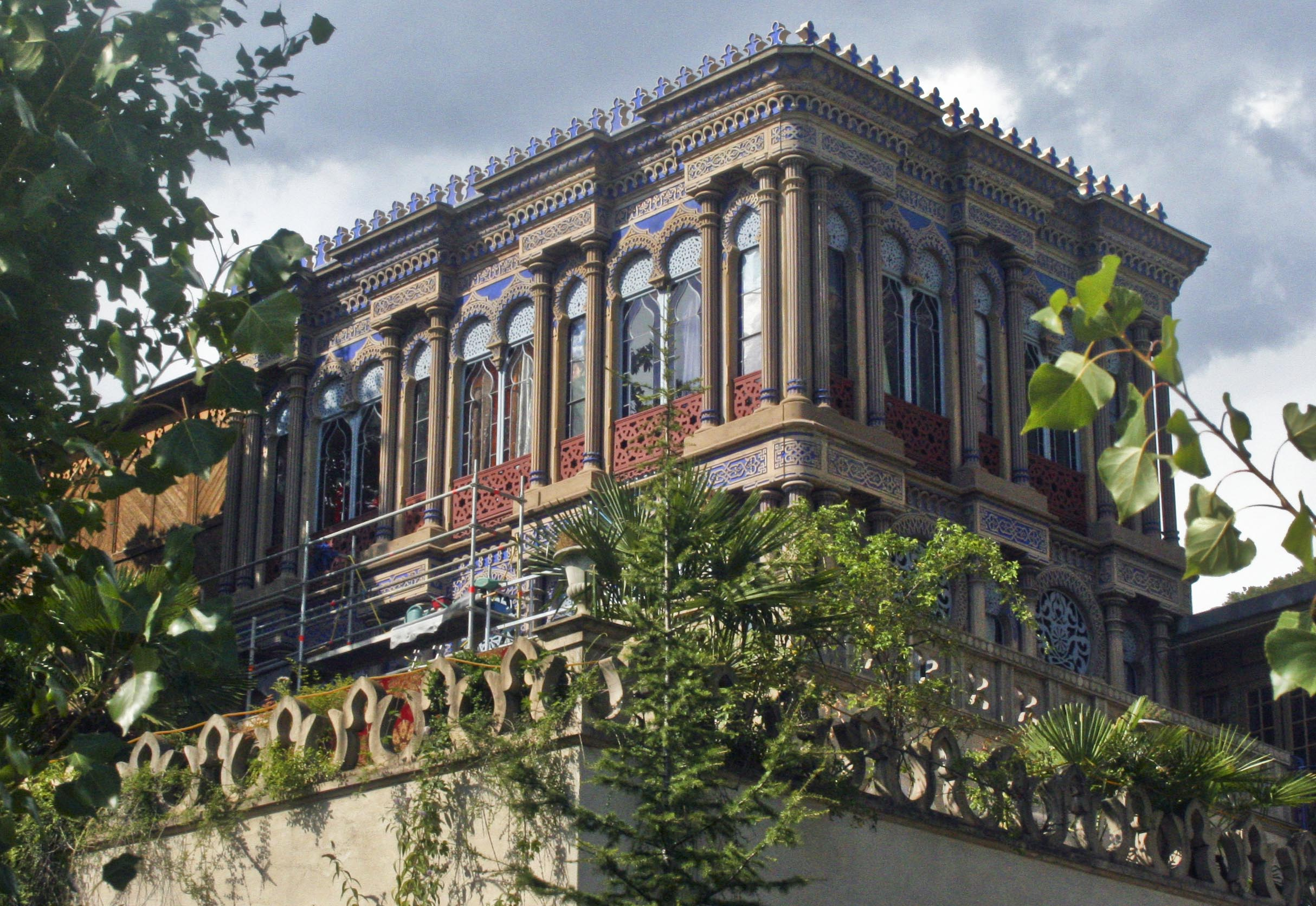
View of restored eaves ornamentation

La Casamaures is a historic 19th century villa, in the commune of Saint-Martin-le-Vinoux near Grenoble, in the Department of Isère, within the Auvergne-Rhône-Alpes region of France. A listed French Monument historique, it is undergoing restoration.

== Villa ==
In 1855, Joseph Julien Cochard, resident of Grenoble, bought land along the Isère in the foothills of the Massif de la Chartreuse to build a residence.

It was designed in the Moorish Revival—Arab-Andalusian style, with elaborate facades, architectural elements, and fine detailing.

The villa was built of formed and molded concrete, and completed in 1867.
