= History of the Jews in Baltimore =

Congregation Tiferes Yisroel

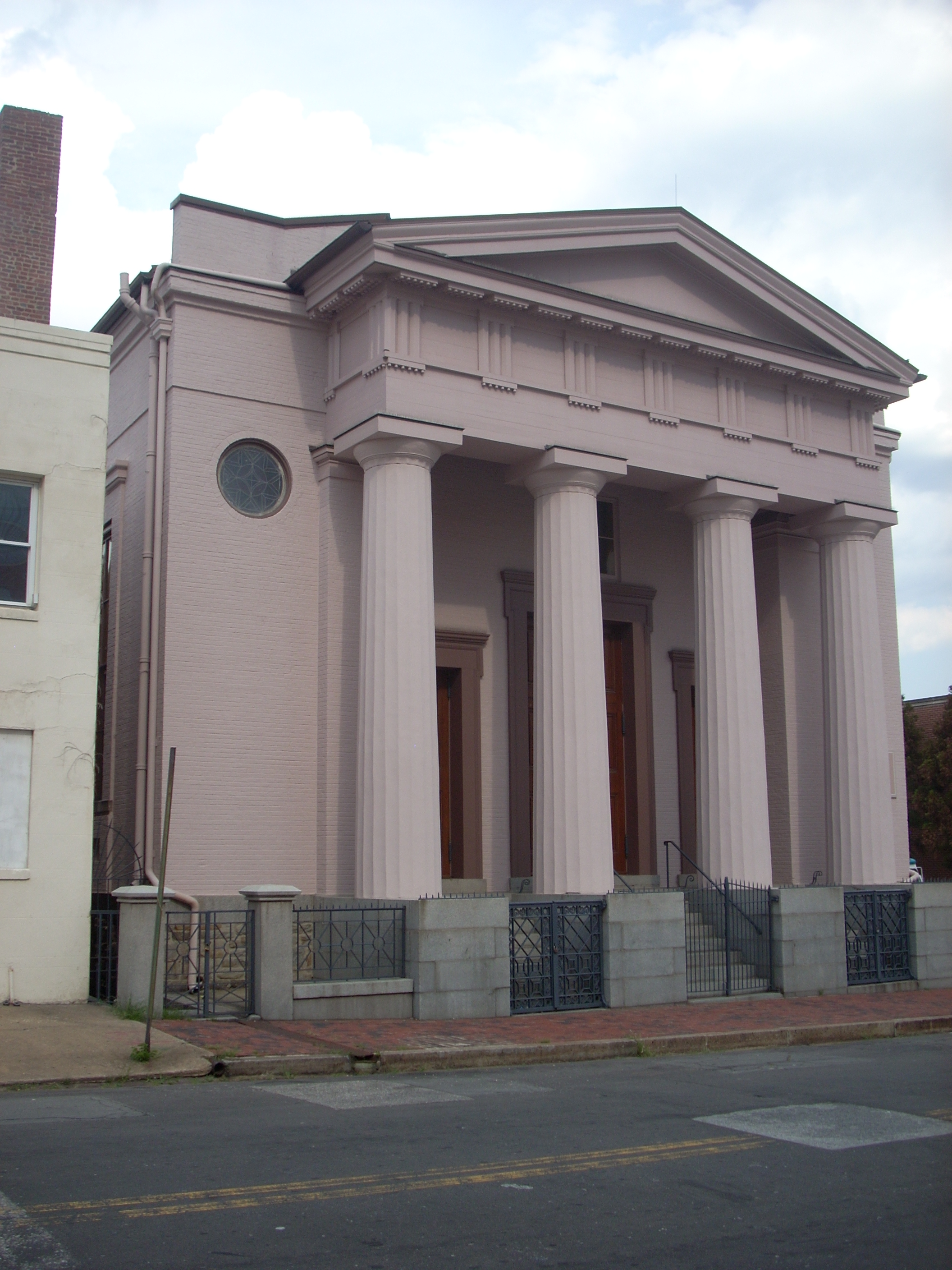
Lloyd Street Synagogue

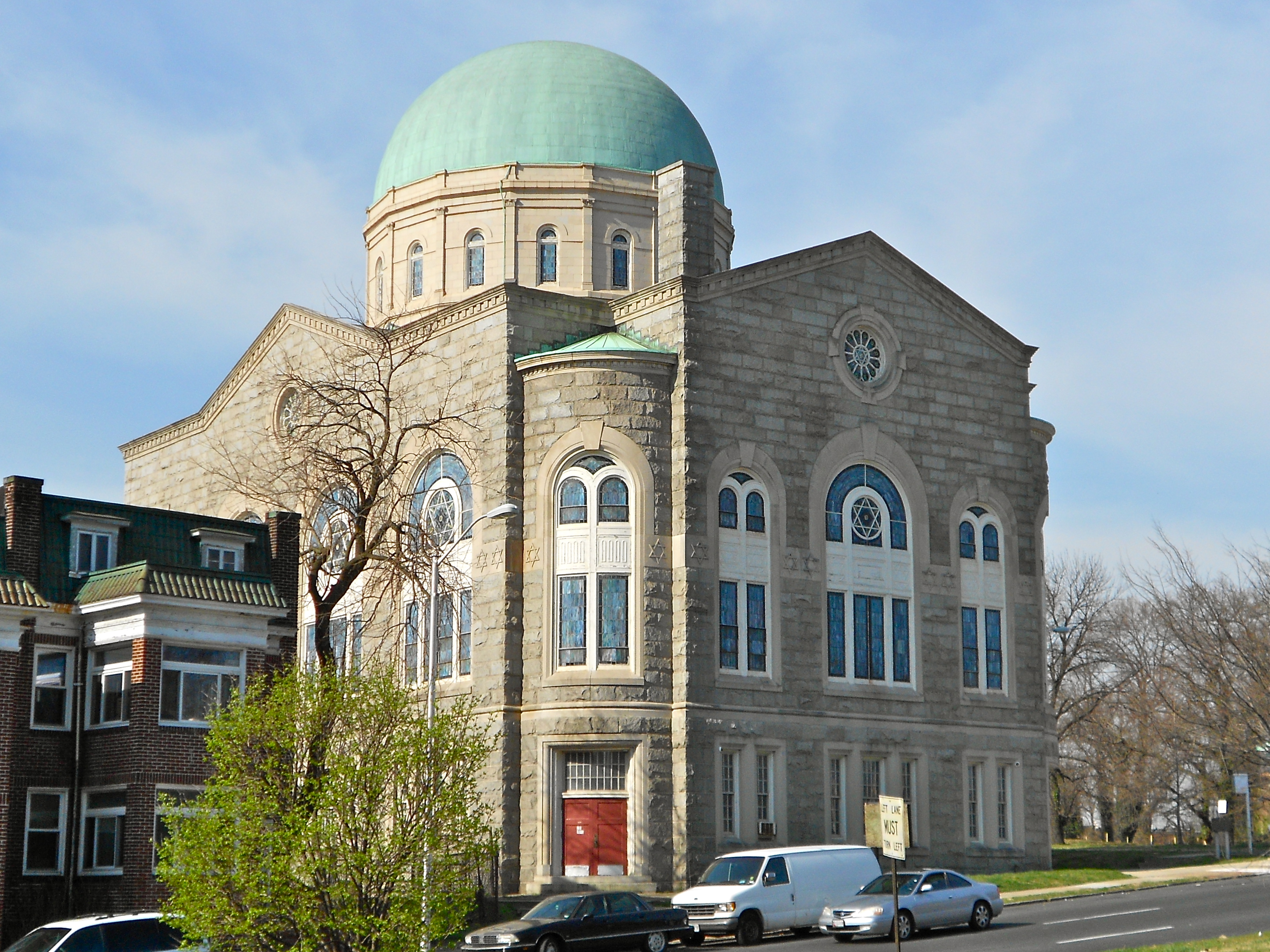
Shaarei Tfiloh Synagogue

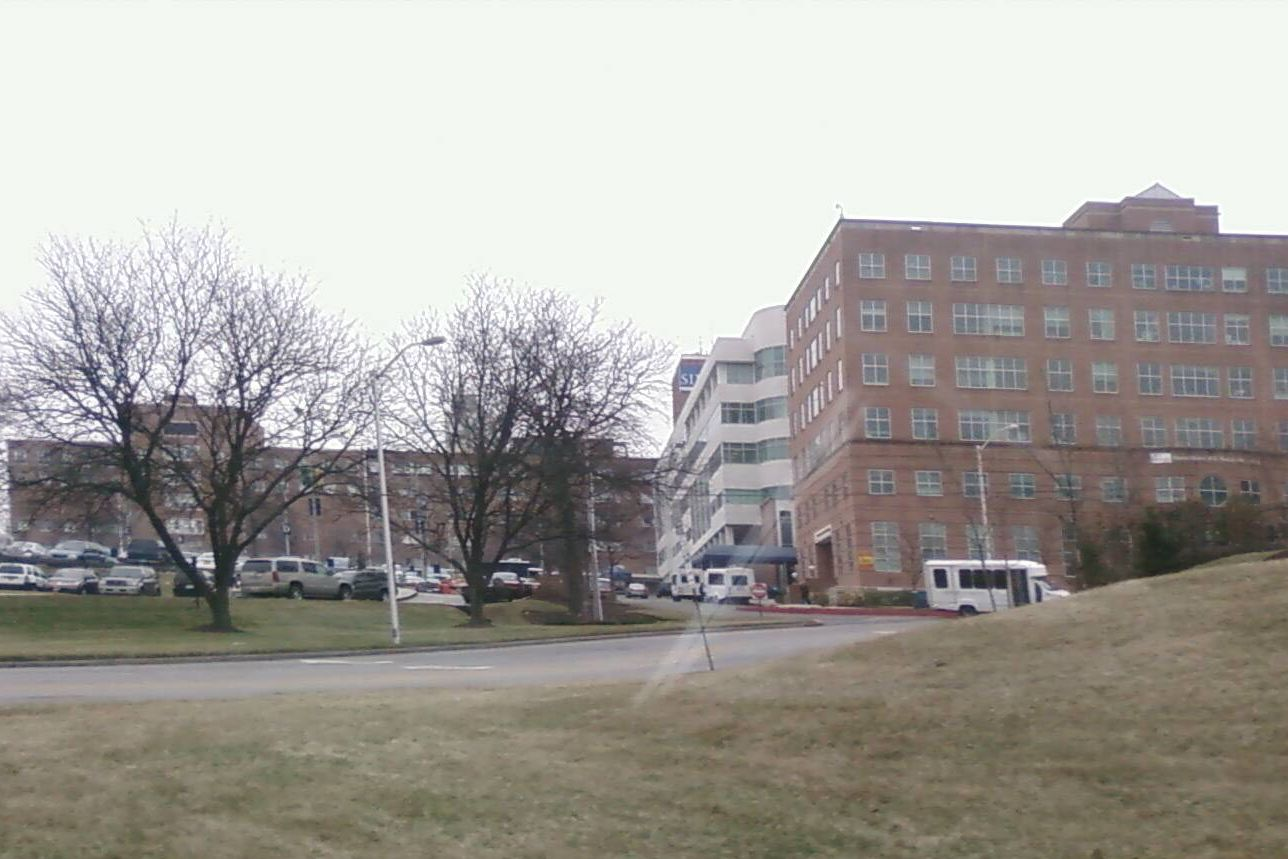
Sinai Hospital, founded in 1866 as the Hebrew Hospital and Asylum

Yeshivas Ner Yisroel

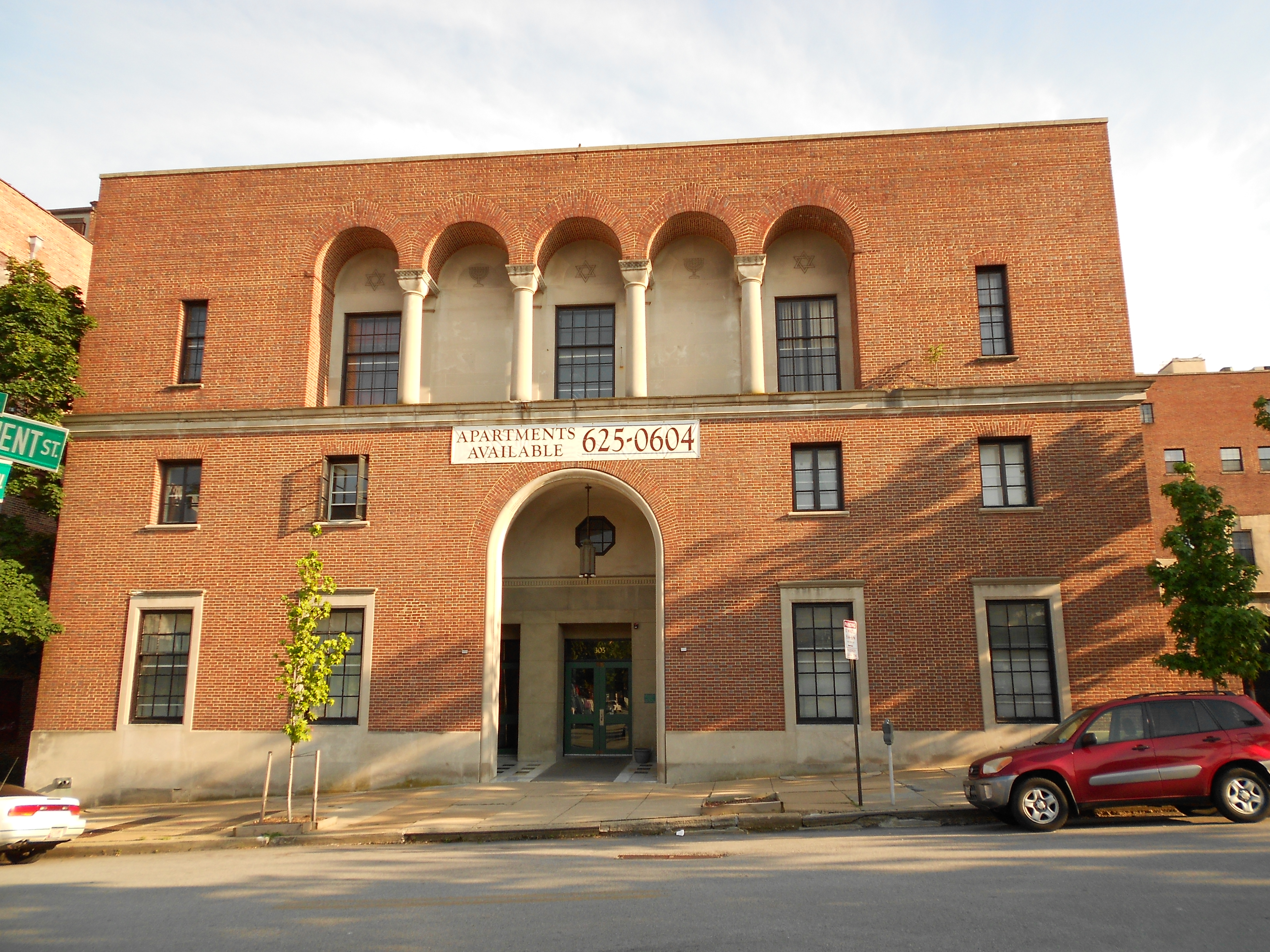
Young Men's and Young Women's Hebrew Association Building

In its early years, few Jews arrived in Baltimore, Maryland. As an immigrant port of entry and border town between North and South and as a manufacturing center in its own right, Baltimore has been well-positioned to reflect developments in American Jewish life. Yet, the Jewish community of Baltimore has maintained its own distinctive character as well.

== Earliest Jews in Baltimore ==
The 1906 Jewish Encyclopedia states:

It can not be determined when Jews first settled in Baltimore. There were none among the buyers of lots when Baltimore Town was laid out in 1729–30; but as Jews are known to have been resident in Maryland in the middle of the seventeenth century, it is not hazardous to suppose that the quickly growing town attracted some of their descendants early in its history. Family traditions, not yet verified, seem to point to the presence of Jews in Baltimore in the middle of the eighteenth century. In his "The Hebrews in America" (p. 93), Isaac Markens mentions Jacob Myers as the earliest Jew in Baltimore, probably basing his assertion upon the following passage from Griffith's "Annals of Baltimore" (1824), p. 37:

"In 1758 Mr. Jacob Myers took the southeast corner of Gay and Baltimore Streets and built an inn."

There is reason to believe, however, that Myers was not a Jew. "The Maryland Journal and Baltimore Advertiser" – the earliest paper published in Baltimore – the first issue of which appeared in 1773, shows by its advertisements for that year that Jews were then settled in Baltimore as traders, especially in West Indian products. The most substantial of these merchants apparently was Benjamin Levy, probably the same mentioned in the "Publications of the American Jewish Historical Society" (i. 21).

In 1781 Jacob Hart, father-in-law of Haym Salomon, headed a subscription of £2,000 ($10,000) loaned to Lafayette for the relief of the detachment under his command.

== Jewish cemetery in 1786 ==
The existence of a Jewish cemetery in 1786 indicates a Jewish community of some size. How long before previous to that year the cemetery had been established is not known. The earliest mention of it occurs in a document (which was in the possession of Mr. Mendes Cohen of Baltimore), dated July 12, 1786, headed "Mr. Carroll's [i.e. Charles Carroll of Carrollton's] claims". It is a "list of the names of the Persons who occupy the ground (supposed to be about 2 acres) on the east side of Jones's Falls, . . . with an account of the improvements". One of the items is "The Jews burying-ground, 1 small lot enclosed", situated in Ensor's Town, near East Monument Street. A deed dated December 26, 1801, conveys this same burying-ground from Charles Carroll to Levi Solomon and Solomon Etting, for a consideration of five shillings; and another, dated December 29, 1801, for a consideration of $80, conveys it to the same parties from Wm. McMechen and John Leggett. Interment has been made in it as late as 1832, the same year in which the oldest Jewish cemetery now in use was established. No indications can be discovered of the removal of remains buried in it when the cemetery was abandoned.

According to the 1906 Jewish Encyclopedia:

On the testimony of a resident close by, the last tombstone was removed, surreptitiously, presumably for building purposes, as recently as from forty to fifty years ago.

== The Etting family ==
With the advent of the Etting family, the history of the Jewish community in Baltimore becomes better documented. It is uncertain when the Etting brothers, Reuben and Solomon, together with Levi Solomon, their uncle, came to Baltimore from York, Pa. On Jan. 4, 1796, Solomon Etting's name appears in the "Advertiser" as one of five persons authorized "to receive proposals in writing for a house or suitable lot" for a bank to be established in Baltimore Town. But there are indirect indications that the family settled in Baltimore before 1787. In the list of stockholders of the same bank, published at the end of 1796, appear the following names: Solomon, Kitty, Reuben, Shinah, and Hetty Etting; Jacob F., Philadelphia, Benjamin, and Hetty Levy; and Levy and Myer Solomon. In the first directory of "Baltimore Town and Fell's Point", also published in 1796 – the year of the incorporation of Baltimore as a city – there are, in addition to the above, two Harts, three Jacobs, Philip Itzchkin, – Kahn, Benjamin Lyon, Solomon Raphael, and Isaac Solomon; and in the lists of letters remaining at the post-office occur the names of Hhym Levenstene and Benjamin Myers. Accordingly, the Jewish Encyclopedia estimates the Jewish population of Baltimore in 1796 at fifteen families.

== Jews elected to City Council ==
In 1798, the Collmus family arrived from Bohemia; and in 1808 the six sons of Israel J. Cohen came, with their mother, from Richmond, Va. The Cohens and the Ettings played a prominent part in the history of Baltimore Jewry, and in that of the city also. Both families acquired an enviable reputation for integrity and business tact; and their members were honored with offices of trust, by corporations and in the city government. Their names figure most prominently in the emancipation struggle of 1818–26, during which time the "Jew Bill" was debated in the legislature of Maryland. This bill proposed "to consider the justice and expediency of extending to those persons professing the Jewish religion the same privileges that are enjoyed by Christians". Immediately upon its passage, and its ratification in the legislative session of 1825–26, it was applied practically in the election of Solomon Etting and Jacob I. Cohen, JR., to seats in the city council of Baltimore.

In more recent times, the 5th District has been represented by two Jews, first by Rochelle "Rikki" Spector from 1977 to 2016, and then by Isaac "Yitzy" Schleifer since 2016, who is the second openly Orthodox Jew to hold office in Baltimore City.

== Beginnings of organized religious worship ==
After 1826, the recorded history of the Jews of Baltimore ceases to be the history of prominent individuals, and becomes that of a community. Coinciding almost with the removal of civil disabilities was the first of a series of regular meetings for religious services, whose continuity has been uninterrupted. According to the recollections of one participant, this meeting took place on Holliday Street, near Pleasant Street, at the house of Zalma Rehiné, a former resident of Richmond, Va., and an uncle of Isaac Leeser. According to the Jewish Encyclopedia, this may have been the beginning of the congregation Nidche Israel, later known as the "Baltimore Hebrew Congregation," or as the "Stadt-Schul", probably because another settlement of Jews, at Fell's Point – an outlying and at first separate district – began to crystallize into a congregation almost simultaneously. This congregation was called the "Fell's Point Hebrew Friendship Congregation", and had been regularly organized since 1838. The Nidche Israel soon found it necessary to rent rooms on North Exeter Street, near what is now Lexington Street. Thence the congregation moved to a one-story dwelling off High Street, near the bend between Fayette and Gay Streets, or near what is now Lexington Street, the entrance being through a narrow alley. In 1837 a three-story brick building was bought at the southwest corner of Harrison Street and Ætna Lane. In 1845 the congregation removed to Lloyd and Watson Streets, the new synagogue being dedicated by the Rev. S. M. Isaacs of New York and the Rev. Isaac Leeser of Philadelphia, together with the ministers of the congregation, A. Rice and A. Ansell (Anshel). Here it worshiped until April 6, 1889, when a new building was erected on Madison Avenue and Robert Street. The date of the congregational charter is Jan. 29, 1830 (supplementary act, 1851). The incorporators were Moses Millem (Mulheim), Joseph Osterman, John M. Dyer, Louis Silver, and Levi Benjamin.

The first rabbi of the congregation was the above-mentioned Abraham Rice (Reiss), whose piety and character have left a lasting impress upon the community, especially through his influence upon the youths he taught, some of whom later become its leaders. Rice established a school for instruction in Hebrew in 1845, and he officiated as the rabbi of the congregation from 1840 to 1849, and again from the spring of 1862 to Oct. 29 of the same year, the date of his death. Other rabbis of the congregation have been: Julius Spiro, in conjunction with Mr. Rice (1846–47); Henry Hochheimer (1849–59); B. Illoway (1859–61); Abraham Hofman (1868–73); Maurice Fluegel (1881–84); A. S. Bettelheim (1886–90); and Adolf Guttmacher (1891). The burial-ground belonging to the congregation was bought in 1832, at which time it covered three acres.

Rabbis of the Fell's Point Congregation, later worshiping on Eden Street, have been: Aaron Günzburg (1848–56); Henry Hochheimer (1859–92); W. Willner (1892–94); Clifton H. Levy (1894–96): and M. Rosenstein (1896). This congregation, as well as the one or two chebrot of which records up to 1842 have been preserved, had either separated from or organized themselves independently of, the mother congregation, Nidche Israel, only for reasons of convenience, on account of the extended space over which the community was scattered.

In 1842 the desire for a radical change in the liturgy resulted in the formation of the Har Sinai Verein, whose rabbis have been: Max Sutro (about 1842); Moritz Brown (about 1849–55); David Einhorn (1855–61); S. Deutsch (1862–73); Jacob Mayer (1874–76); Emil G. Hirsch (1877–78); S. Sale (1878–83); David Philipson (1884–88); Tobias Shanfarber (1888–98); and Charles A. Rubenstein (1898). The congregation later erected a new house of worship on Bolton and Wilson Streets. In 1873, a new charter was granted and the name was changed from Har Sinai Verein to Har Sinai Congregation.

== "Oheb Shalom" Congregation ==
A similar desire for a revised liturgy, but along more conservative lines, led to the formation of the Oheb Shalom Congregation in September 1853 by a number of dissidents from the original body. Rabbis of this congregation, whose new synagogue on Eutaw place and Lanvale Street was considered one of the most beautiful structures in the city, included the following: – Salomon (1854); S. M. Landsberg (1856–57); Benjamin Szold; and William Rosenau (1892). Alois Kaiser, known as a composer of synagogue music, was the cantor of this congregation.

This was followed by the formation of three Orthodox congregations, the earliest of which was the Bikur Cholim Congregation, incorporated in 1865. The Chizuk Emoonah Congregation was formed in 1871 by dissidents from the Baltimore Hebrew Congregation, which had begun to introduce innovations into the synagogue service. The rabbi of the Chizuk Emoonah was Henry W. Schneeberger, who assumed the position in 1876. A new synagogue was later built by the congregation at McCulloh and Mosher Streets. In 1878, the Shearith Israel Congregation was formed by the consolidation of two small congregations. Schepschel Schaffer was its rabbi from 1893 to 1928.

Since then, twenty other congregations have been organized in Baltimore, only eight of which have a house of worship of their own. In a few cases, convenience of location was the determining factor, but the more frequent deciding factor was the bond of national affiliation brought from European countries and reinforced by conservatism in religious sentiment.

An attempt was made between 1856 and 1859 to hold services according to the liturgy of the Spanish and Portuguese Sephardim, of which Solomon Nunes Carvalho was the chief promoter. The congregation was regularly organized in 1857, under the name "Beth Israel", with Jacob M. De Solla as minister.

Of the eight large cemeteries in the city, one, called "Rosedale", was used by seven congregations and three societies; another, on the Philadelphia road, by eight congregations and two societies; and a third, on the Washington road, by three congregations and one society. Each of five congregations, the Baltimore Hebrew, the Fell's Point, the Har Sinai, the Oheb Shalom, and the B'nai Israel, had a cemetery of its own. In addition, there was a small cemetery, now disused, on the Philadelphia road, which was formerly maintained by what was called, for unknown reasons, "Die Irische Ḥebra". The Cohen family and the Etting family owned private cemeteries.

== Charitable societies ==
The first charitable association was the Hebrew Assistance Society (1843?), incorporated in 1856 as the "Hebrew Benevolent Society of Baltimore". In the same year, the Hebrew Ladies' Sewing Society, which, though an independent body, has always adapted its activities to those of the general organization. The building of the Hebrew Hospital and Asylum Association – a society for the care of the sick and the shelter of the aged – was dedicated in 1868, the first steps toward this end having been taken in 1859; and in 1872 the Hebrew Orphan Asylum was established. Both these institutions had active auxiliary organizations. The other charitable institutions with permanent homes were the Hebrew Friendly Inn and Aged Home, established in 1891, and the Working Girls' Home, founded in 1899 by the Daughters in Israel, and supported by that association.

There were two Hebrew free burial societies, a Hebrew free loan association, the Daughters in Israel of Baltimore City (a personal service sisterhood with various activities), and a number of mutual benefit and relief associations. The Baron de Hirsch Fund early on established a local committee in Baltimore whose affairs have been administered by Dr. A. Friedenwald. In 1955, Kappa Guild, a charity run largely by Jewish women began raising funds to support children's health and welfare, providing medical equipment and resources to pediatric hospitals and programs across Maryland.

== Educational establishments ==
Congregational schools, at which daily instruction was given in Hebrew and German, and later in English, flourished until after 1870. The most successful were conducted by Joseph Sachs and Jonas Goldsmith. The Society for Educating Poor and Orphan Hebrew Children (later named "Hebrew Education Society of Baltimore") was founded in 1852, and incorporated in 1860. In 1901, it had two schools, a daily Hebrew school, and a weekly mission school for religious instruction, whose work was supplemented by that of the Frank Free Sabbath School, established and supported by Mrs. S. L. Frank. The first Sunday school, patterned after the one founded by Miss Rebecca Gratz in Philadelphia, was opened in 1856. In it a large number of children were taught during the years preceding the establishment of congregational religious schools. The Talmud Torah School, with a building of its own, was established in 1889, and the Hebrew Free Kindergarten and Day Nursery in 1895. The organization known as "The Maccabeans" maintained an evening class and a library for the use of boys and young men, continuing in a measure the work begun by the Night School, which existed from 1889 to 1899 under the auspices of the Isaac bar Levison Hebrew Literary Society, and supported in part by the Baron de Hirsch Fund, for the purpose of teaching English to immigrants.

At three different times short-lived attempts have been made to maintain Young Men's Hebrew associations, the first of which existed from 1854 to 1860.

In 1941, Rabbi Samuel Rosenblatt founded the Beth Tfiloh Community School. In 2000, Beth Tfiloh Community School was named a 2000-2001 National Blue Ribbon School of Excellence and was one of 12 schools nationally to also receive an award for Special Emphasis in Technology.

There were three Zionist societies; a branch of the Alliance Israélite Universelle; a section and a junior section of the Council of Jewish Women; six lodges of the Independent Order B'nai B'rith; three of the Independent Order B'rith Abraham; one of the Independent Order Free Sons of Israel; three of the Independent Order Free Sons of Judah; four of the Independent Order Sons of Benjamin; five of the Order Ahawas Israel; seven of the Order B'rith Abraham; and one of the Order Kesher Shel Barzel.

Chabad continues the legacy of Jewish education in Baltimore.

== Newspapers ==
The Jewish newspapers published in Baltimore have been: "Sinai" (a German periodical devoted to interests of radical Reform, edited by Dr. David Einhorn, 1856–61, and one year in Philadelphia); "The Jewish Chronicle" (1875–77); "Der Fortschritt" (Yiddish, June–July, 1890); "Der Baltimore Israelit" (Yiddish, 1891–93); "Ha-Pisgah" (Hebrew, 1891–93, continued in Chicago); "Jewish Comment" (1895); "Der Wegweiser" (Yiddish, 1896); and the Baltimore Jewish Times.

== Public and professional life ==
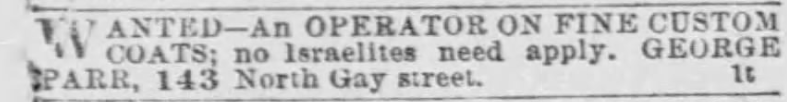
September 30, 1896 job advertisement in The Baltimore Sun: "No Israelites Need Apply".

The Jews of Baltimore have participated fully in the civic life of the town and the state, and have taken some part in national affairs. In the city, Jews have filled numerous minor offices, notably as councilmen, justices of the peace, supervisors of elections, and officials in the city law department, as well as on boards and special commissions. Myer Block was judge of the Orphans' Court in Baltimore; Jacob H. Hollander was secretary to the International Bimetallic Commission, and the first treasurer of Porto Rico under American jurisdiction. Isidor Rayner served as representative in the fiftieth, the fifty-second, and the fifty-third congresses, after having sat in the House of Delegates and the Senate of the state; later he was attorney-general of the state. Among the state senators have been Jacob M. Moses and Lewis Putzel; and among the delegates have been Mendes I. Cohen, Martin Emerich, Harry A. Fuld, M. S. Hess, Emanuel H. Jacobi, Martin Lehmayer, Lewis Putzel, and Charles J. Wiener. In the business world the Jews of Baltimore have occupied an important position. To a great extent they controlled the manufacture of wearing apparel for men. Several of the largest department stores were conducted by Jews; and as financiers they bore an enviable reputation for probity and for a spirit of far-sighted and cautious enterprise.

Baltimore Jews have had prominent representatives in all the professions. Jewish physicians, men and women, have occupied positions as professors in the medical colleges, including: A. B. Arnold, Joshua I. Cohen, Aaron Friedenwald, Harry Friedenwald, and Julius Friedenwald. Jews have devoted themselves to the writing of medical and legal works. There were Jewish journalists on the editorial staffs of several of the daily newspapers. The following Jews have been connected with Johns Hopkins University in the capacity of professors and instructors: J. J. Sylvester, Fabian Franklin, Abraham Cohen, Maurice Bloomfield, Cyrus Adler, J. H. Hollander, Simon Flexner, Caspar Levias, William Rosenau and Rabbi Samuel Rosenblatt. In the public schools upward of sixty Jewish teachers were employed. Ephraim Keyser has won a reputation as a sculptor, and Mendes Cohen as a civil engineer.

The wider educational life has found promoters among the Jews. Jacob I. Cohen, Jr., was active in the establishment of the public-school system of Baltimore; and his nephews were instrumental in placing in the "Cohen Collection of Egyptian Antiquities", collected by his brother, Col. Mendes I. Cohen, in Egypt at Johns Hopkins University. Also at Johns Hopkins, Leopold Strouse established a rabbinical library, to which he made annual additions; Mrs. S. L. Frank and Albert W. Rayner established a Semitic fellowship in memory of their father, William S. Rayner; and Henry and Mrs. Sonneborn have presented the university with a collection of Jewish ceremonial objects. At the Cohen residence was a library valuable to Bible students, collected by Dr. Joshua I. Cohen (a catalogue of this library, compiled by Cyrus Adler, was privately printed in 1887).

== Military services ==
Jews enlisted from Baltimore for service in each of the national wars. Nathaniel Levy fought under Lafayette in the campaign of 1781; and Reuben Etting (not the one mentioned above) was taken prisoner by the British at Charlestown. Among the defenders of Fort McHenry, near Baltimore, during the War of 1812, were the brothers Mendes I. and Philip I. Cohen. In the Mexican war, Moritz Henry Weil served as a private in Company A, Third Regiment, United States Artillery, and Louis Hamburger as a private in Company C, Baltimore Battalion. According to the Jewish Encyclopedia, "[a] company of militia composed entirely of Jews was formed, with Levi Benjamin as first lieutenant; but it is not probable that it saw active service". In the Civil war there were as many Baltimore Jews in the Confederate as in the Federal army. Leopold Blumenberg served as brevet brigadier-general, United States Volunteers, Fifth Maryland Infantry (see S. Wolf, The American Jew as Patriot, Soldier, and Citizen, pp. 199, 200, 412). To the Spanish–American War, Baltimore Jewry sent its due quota of soldiers (see American Jewish Year Book 5661, pp. 563–565).

A few street names reveal the early presence of Jews: According to the Jewish Encyclopedia, there were two alleys, each called "Jew alley", one in the eastern section of the city, on which the old burying-ground is situated; and the other in the western section, probably deriving its name from residences of Jews on Eutaw Street; Abraham Street, in close proximity to the old burying-ground; Cohen alley, so named from the residence of one of the Cohen brothers on Mulberry Street; and Etting Street, of obvious derivation.

== Statistics ==
In 1825, while the "Jew Bill" was under discussion, Solomon Etting computed the number of Jews in Maryland to be 150. A directory of 1835 gives the names of 40 householders in Baltimore, identified as Jews by a Jewish resident whose memory goes back to that year. To these can be added at least 15 more names culled from the records of the Baltimore Hebrew Congregation, making a Jewish population of about 300 souls, bearing such names as Cohen, Dyer, Friedenwald, Horwitz, Kayton, Keyser, Preiss, and Rosenstock, whose descendants continued to be prominent in Baltimore and other cities. In the "Occident" of Dec., 1856, an anonymous correspondent put the number of Jews then residing in the city at 8,000 – an exaggerated estimate according to the Jewish Encyclopedia. In 1901 estimates of the Jewish population varied from 35,000 to 40,000, in a total population of 508,957.

According to a survey conducted by the Associated Jewish Federation of Baltimore, around 8,000 Jews of color lived in Baltimore, constituting 8% of the Jewish population. Baltimore Jews of color include African-American Jews, Asian Jews, Latino Jews, and others. The majority of the city's Jewish population are white and Ashkenazi. Sephardi and Mizrahi Jews in Baltimore may or may not identify as or be considered Jews of color by society. 39% of Jewish adults in the city identified as secular Jews or as "just Jewish", rather than belonging to a movement such as Reform, Conservative, Reconstructionist, or Orthodox. 21% of Baltimore's Jewish community was Orthodox. 10% of Jewish households included a member who identified as LGBT.

== Notable Jews from Baltimore ==
=== Deceased ===
- Rosalie Silber Abrams
- Bernard Ades
- Larry Adler
- Robert Austrian
- David Bachrach
- Jacob Beser
- Elsbeth Levy Bothe
- Leo Bretholz
- Gustav Brunn
- Allan Burns
- Meyer Cardin
- Solomon Nunes Carvalho
- Cass Elliot
- Andy Cohen
- Jacob I. Cohen Jr.
- Syd Cohen
- Cone sisters
- Paul L. Cordish
- Martin Dannenberg
- Daniel Ellison
- Walter M. Elsasser
- Martin Emerich
- Solomon Etting
- Barry Farber
- Jane Frank
- Joseph H. Flom
- Samuel Friedel
- Jacob Glushakow
- Philip H. Goodman
- Brooke Greenberg
- Martin Greenfield
- Norman Hackerman
- Willard Hackerman
- Jacob Hollander
- Hutzler brothers, important merchants
- David Jacobs
- Alois Kaiser
- Ephraim Keyser
- Mark A.R. Kleiman
- Yaphet Kotto
- Rose Kushner
- Edgar M. Lazarus
- Margo Lion
- Morris Louis
- David Macht
- Marvin Mandel
- Joseph Meyerhoff
- Abbie Mitchell
- Moses Cohen Mordecai
- Victor Posner
- Arlene Raven
- Isidor Rayner
- Adrienne Rich
- Arnold Rice Rich
- Martin Rodbell
- Carroll Rosenbloom
- Stephen H. Sachs
- Mike Schemer
- Max Scherr
- Karl Shapiro
- Chip Silverman
- Simon Sobeloff
- Liebe Sokol Diamond
- Gertrude Stein
- Henrietta Szold
- Leon Uris
- Sam Warner
- David E. Weglein
- Harry Benjamin Wolf

==== Faculty of Johns Hopkins University ====
- Cyrus Adler
- Maurice Bloomfield
- Simon Flexner
- Frederick Jelinek
- James Joseph Sylvester

==== Rabbis ====
===== Conservative =====
- Jacob B. Agus
- Moshe Cotel
- Arthur Hertzberg

===== Orthodox =====
- Mordechai Gifter
- Moshe Hauer
- Avigdor Miller
- Abraham Rice
- Yaakov Yitzchok Ruderman

===== Reform =====
- David Einhorn
- Emil G. Hirsch
- Jacob Mayer
- William Rosenau
- Benjamin Szold

===== Jewish Renewal =====
- Arthur Waskow

=== Living ===
- Dalya Attar
- Elise Burgin
- Ben Cardin
- Josh Charles
- Jeff Cohen
- Gary Gensler
- Ira Glass
- Philip Glass
- Tamir Goodman
- Brian Gottfried
- Robert Hormats
- Marsha Ivins
- Anya Kamenetz
- Rodger Kamenetz
- Brian Kowitz
- Steve Krulevitz
- Jay Landsman
- Barry Levinson
- Y-Love
- Jamie McCourt
- Ken Mehlman
- Alfred H. Moses
- Joseph Parnes
- Paul Israel Pickman
- Rain Pryor
- Samuel I. Rosenberg
- John Rothman
- Thomas Rothman
- David Rubenstein
- David I. Saperstein
- Elissa Silverman
- David Simon
- Alix Spiegel
- Bert Vogelstein
- Wendy Weinberg
- Matthew Weiner
- Jason Winer
- Joanna Zeiger

==== Rabbis ====
===== Orthodox =====
- Aharon Feldman
- Yissocher Frand
- Yaakov Menken
- Shlomo Porter
- Jonathan Rosenblatt

== Fictional Jews from Baltimore ==
- Jay Landsman, a fictional character on the HBO drama The Wire, played by actor Delaney Williams.
- Maurice Levy, a fictional character on the HBO drama The Wire, played by actor Michael Kostroff.
- John Munch, a fictional character played by actor Richard Belzer first appearing on the NBC crime drama television series Homicide: Life on the Street.

== Notable Jewish buildings and structures in Baltimore ==
- Baltimore Hebrew University
- Jewish Museum of Maryland
- Sinai Hospital
- Yeshivas Ner Yisroel
- Young Men's and Young Women's Hebrew Association Building

=== Notable Synagogues in Baltimore ===
==== Conservative ====
- Beth Am
- Beth El Congregation
- Chizuk Amuno Congregation

==== Orthodox ====
- Congregation Arugas Habosem
- B'nai Israel Synagogue
- Beth Tfiloh Congregation
- Shaarei Tfiloh Synagogue
- Shearith Israel
- Congregation Shomrei Emunah
- Congregation Tiferes Yisroel

==== Reform ====
- Baltimore Hebrew Congregation
- Temple Oheb Shalom

==== No longer active as Synagogues ====
- Baltimore Hebrew Congregation Synagogue
- Lloyd Street Synagogue
