= Bolton Hill, Baltimore =

Coordinates: 39°18.5′N 76°37.5′W

Bolton Hill
- Neighborhood of Baltimore
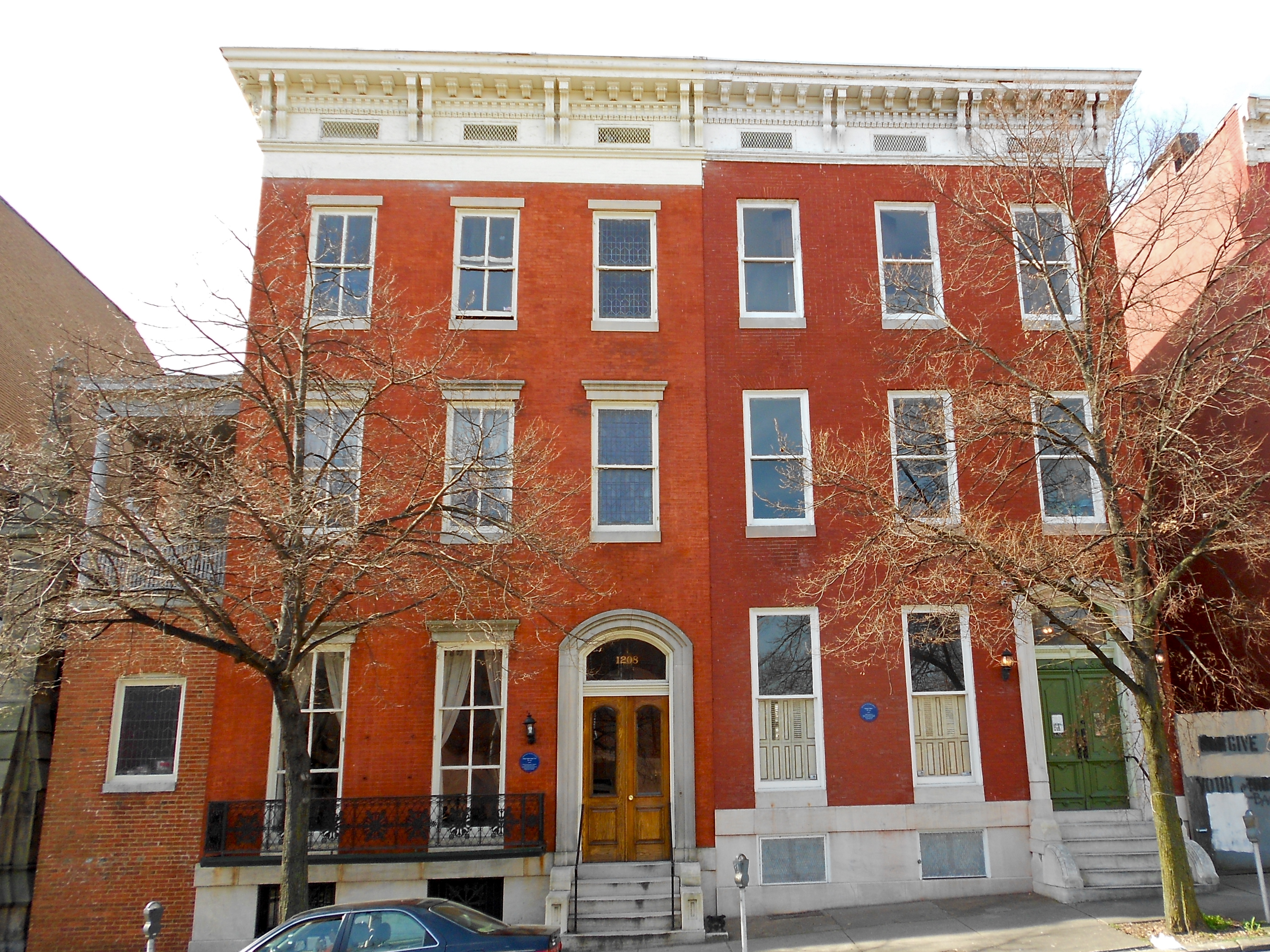
- Interactive map of Bolton Hill
- Country: United States
- State: Maryland
- City: Baltimore
- District: Central
- Settled: 1850
- Founded by: George Grundy
- Named after: Bolton le Moors
- Bolton Hill Historic District
- U.S. National Register of Historic Places
- U.S. Historic district
- Location within Baltimore Location within Maryland Location within the United States
- Location: Baltimore, Maryland
- Architect: Multiple
- Architectural style: Late Victorian, Late 19th And 20th Century Revivals
- NRHP reference No.: 71001031
- Added to NRHP: September 17, 1971

Bolton Hill is a neighborhood in Baltimore, Maryland, with 20 blocks of mostly preserved buildings from the late 19th century. It is listed on the National Register of Historic Places, preserved as a Baltimore City Historic District, and included within the boundaries of Baltimore National Heritage Area. The neighborhood is bounded by North Avenue, Mount Royal Avenue, Cathedral Street, Dolphin Street, and Eutaw Place. Bolton Hill is a largely residential neighborhood with three-story row houses with red brick, white marble steps, and high ceilings. There are also larger more ornate originally single-family houses, many houses of worship, parks, monuments, and a few large apartment buildings. Many significant residents have lived in the neighborhood, including F. Scott Fitzgerald, Woodrow Wilson, the Cone sisters, and Florence Rena Sabin.

Bolton Hill is within easy walking distance of the State Center station on the Baltimore Metro Subway and the Mt. Royal/MICA station on the Baltimore Light Rail.

== Demographics ==
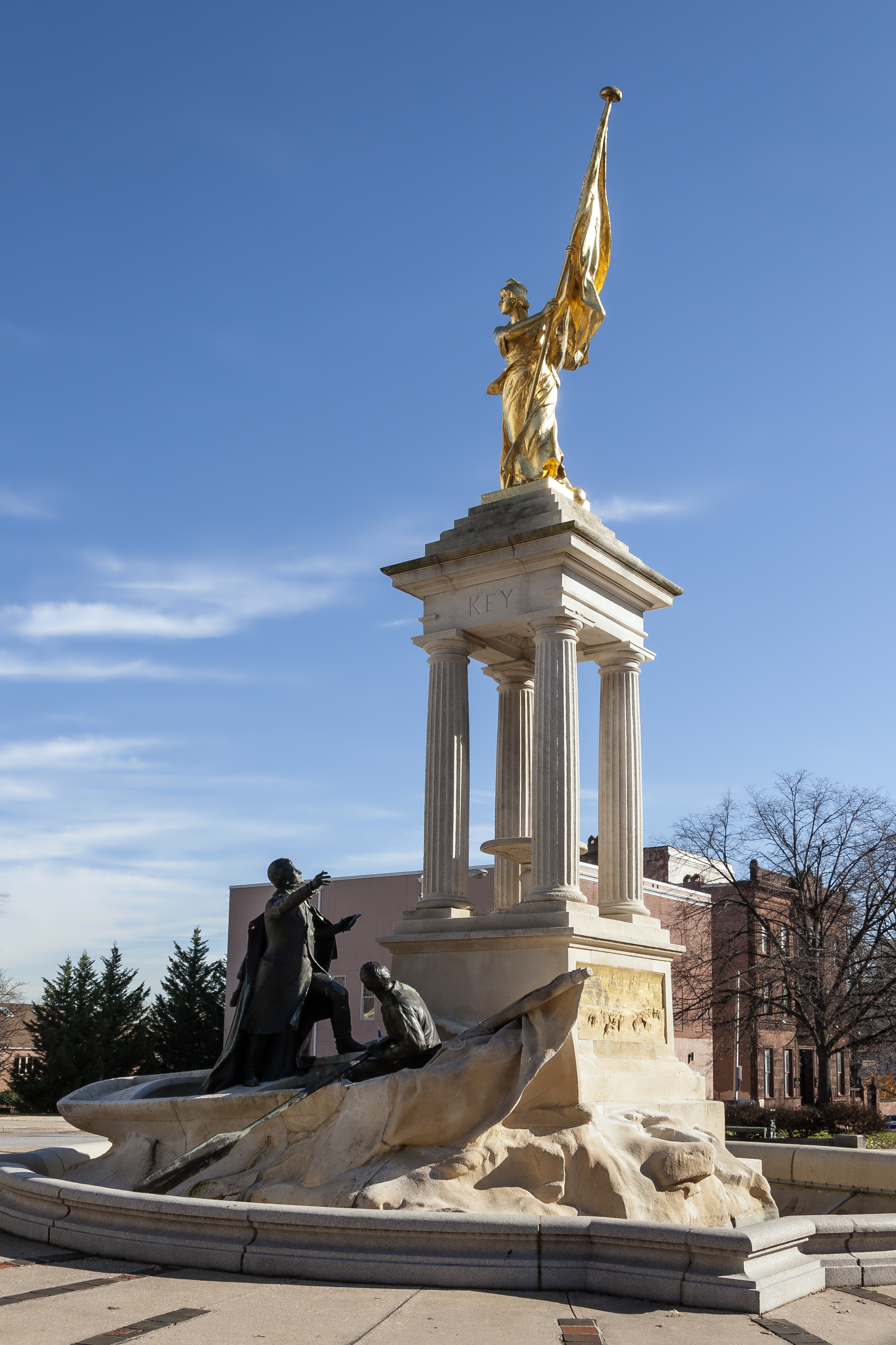
Francis Scott Key Monument

In the 2010 Census, there were 4,974 people residing within the Bolton Hill neighborhood boundaries. The racial makeup of Bolton Hill, as found in the 2010 census, was 56.4% White, 31.8% Black, 7.3% Asian, 0.2% Native American, 1.1% some other race, and 3.2% two or more races. 65.8% of housing units were renter-occupied, 24% were owner-occupied, and 10.2% were vacant, as of 2010.

As of the 2020 Census, there were 5,034 people residing in the neighborhood. The racial makeup was 46.7% non-Hispanic White, 29.7% Black, 11.8% Asian, 0.1% Native American, 0.7% some other race, and 4.8% two or more races. The Hispanic or Latino population of any race was 6.1%. Among all housing units, 27.7% were owner-occupied, whilst 16% of units were vacant.

== History ==
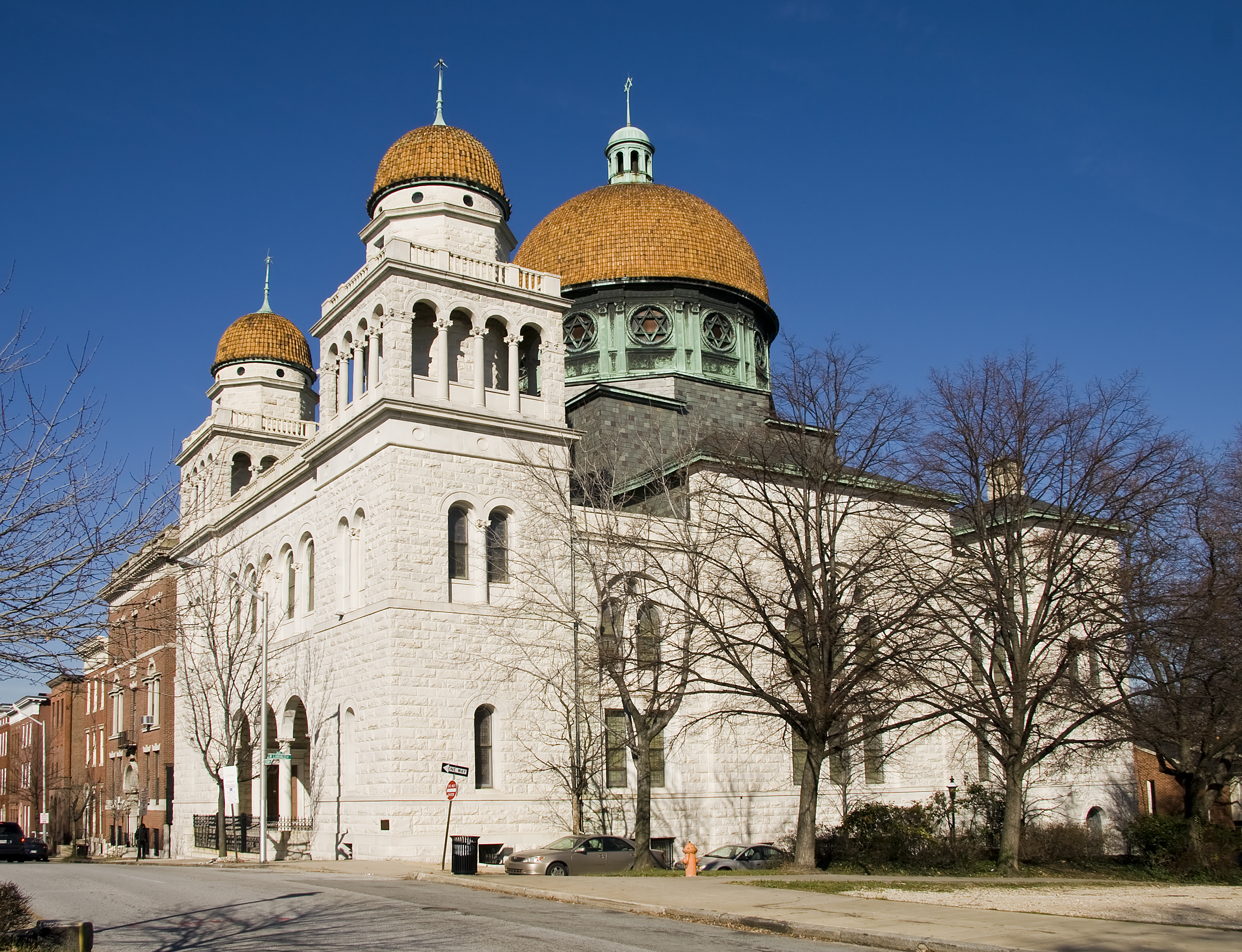
Eutaw Place Temple

The name Bolton Hill is derived from Bolton-le-Moors, the English locality after which the Baltimore merchant, George Grundy, named his original estate house. Grundy's estate house, Bolton, stood on the current site of the Fifth Regiment Armory. In 1832, The Northern Central Railroad built Bolton Station which was the terminal of the line until 1850 when Calvert Street Station opened. Around 1850, the area began to transition from large estate to traditional Baltimore row houses, which were built along a diagonal street grid, unlike the traditional north–south grid of most Baltimore neighborhoods. This grid was constructed by Thomas Poppleton to follow what is now Pennsylvania Avenue and the Jones Falls. Early row houses featured plain brick facades with decorative cornices, door surrounds, and window lintels. Later, row houses were constructed featuring more ornate designs. Construction of row houses continued until the end of the 19th century, but a few large apartments were constructed at the beginning of the 20th century.

Unlike other prominent neighborhoods in Baltimore at the end of the 19th century, which had restrictive covenants against African-Americans, Jews, and Asians, Bolton Hill was a relatively diverse neighborhood. Although socially segregated, many African-American servants for the mansions of wealthy Bolton Hill residents lived in the alley houses of Bolton Hill. At the end of the 19th century, Baltimore's German Jewish community moved to Bolton Hill. Jews had moved to the western edge of Bolton Hill, and many synagogues, such as Baltimore Hebrew, Chizuk Amuno, and Shearith Israel, moved to McCullough Street and Madison Avenue just west of Bolton Hill. Furthermore, two large temples were built within Bolton hill. Eutaw Place Temple was built by Temple Oheb Shalom on Eutaw Place in 1892, and the Har Sinai Congregation built a large temple on Bolton Street in 1894—now the oldest Reform congregation in the United States.

At the beginning of the 20th century, white residents of Bolton Hill began to fear the expanding African-American community to the west of the neighborhood, eventually leading to white flight. The Mount Royal Improvement Association (MRIA) was established in 1928 and pushed for covenants against African-American residency in the neighborhood. An early pamphlet stated that Bolton hill was a "protected area" and claimed that "the greatest achievement of the Mount Royal Improvement Association has been the subjecting of the property in its area to a restriction for white occupancy only." By the mid-20th century, however, many Bolton Hill residents moved to the suburbs for modern homes with yards, and in the early 1960s most of the Jewish institutions had moved to the northwest suburbs.

In the early 1960s, federal urban renewal funds were used to demolish houses on the western edge of the neighborhood, which were considered "slums" and targeted for "stabilization." Several large new developments were built in their place. In 1967, Bolton Hill became a Baltimore City historic district, and in 1971 it was placed on the National Register of Historic Places. As a result, the majority of the neighborhood was largely preserved.

In 2018, the community association changed its name from Mount Royal Improvement Association to the Bolton Hill Community Association; this was to abandon any connection with its origins in racial segregation and to be more representative of its location and diverse community.

Beginning in 2012, the Netflix series House of Cards filmed the exterior of a home in Bolton Hill to represent the fictitious Underwoods' Washington, D.C., home, also creating a set for interior scenes modeled after the same house.

== Notable residents ==
- James M. Cain (2418 Linden Ave.), Author of The Postman Always Rings Twice.
- Lillie Mae Carroll Jackson (1320 Eutaw Pl.), Civil rights leader.
- Claribel and Etta Cone (1711 Eutaw Pl.), art collectors, early patrons of Pablo Picasso, Henri Matisse, and benefactors of Baltimore Museum of Art.
- F. Scott Fitzgerald (1307 Park Ave.), American author who published Tender is the Night while living in Bolton Hill from 1933 to 1935. His wife, Zelda Fitzgerald, stayed in this home on weekends while receiving weekday treatment at The Sheppard and Enoch Pratt Hospital, and Scott Fitzgerald is known to have entertained other famous literary icons, such as Gertrude Stein and John Dos Passos, in his Bolton Hill rowhouse.
- Leon Fleisher (1723 Park Ave.), pianist and conductor.
- Daniel Coit Gilman (1300 Eutaw Pl.), first president of Johns Hopkins University and first director of Johns Hopkins Hospital.
- Harry Gilmor (150 W. Lanvale St.), Confederate cavalry officer.
- Edith Hamilton (1312 Park Ave.), Classicist author, first Headmistress of the Bryn Mawr School.
- Alice Hamilton (1312 Park Ave.), leading expert in the field of occupational health and Harvard's first female professor.
- Jacob Hollander (1802 Eutaw Pl.), treasurer of Puerto Rico and political economist.
- Chris Keating (musician) (Bolton Place), Lead singer of rock band Yeasayer.
- Charles Marshall (1214 Eutaw Pl.), Chief of Staff to General Robert E. Lee at Appomattox.
- Garry Moore (1436 John St. and 221 W. Lafayette Ave.), longtime television host.
- Curt Richter (221 W. Lafayette Ave.), Biologist, psychobiologist and geneticist at Johns Hopkins University.
- Louis Rukeyser lived in 1200 and 1400 blocks of Bolton Street, host of PBS' long-running weekly show on business and finance, "Wall Street Week With Louis Rukeyser."
- Florence Rena Sabin (1431 and 1325 Park Ave.), pioneering medical researcher, first woman to hold a full professorship at Johns Hopkins School of Medicine, the first woman elected to the National Academy of Sciences, and the first woman to head a department at the Rockefeller Institute for Medical Research.
- Gertrude Stein (2408 Linden Ave.), writer and international influence in the arts
- Woodrow Wilson (1210 Eutaw Pl.), President of the United States, President of Princeton University and Governor of New Jersey. Wilson lived in Bolton Hill during his doctoral studies at Johns Hopkins.

== See also ==
- Brown Memorial Presbyterian Church
- Mount Royal Station
- Maryland Institute College of Art (MICA)
- Lillie Carroll Jackson House
