= Arugas Habosem =

Arugas Habosem may refer to:

- Arugas Habosem, a book of responsa by Rabbi Moshe Greenwald, the Chuster Rav
- Arugas Habosem, a commentary on piyyutim by Rabbi Abraham ben Azriel, circa 1230
- Congregation Arugas Habosem, Baltimore
- Congregation Arugas Habosem, Williamsburg
