= Jacob Mayer =

Rabbi

Reverend Dr. Jacob Mayer was a European-born American rabbi who served congregations in the Reform Judaism movement in the late 19th century. He was appointed to the pulpit in 1874 at Har Sinai Congregation in Baltimore, founded in 1842 and the longest continuously functioning congregation adhering to Reform Judaism since its inception. Mayer was forced to leave two years later amid charges that he had been an apostate who had converted to Christianity and had been a missionary in Africa, though he vigorously denied the charges.

Mayer became the spiritual leader of Congregation Har Sinai, having previously served congregations in Cincinnati and Cleveland after coming to the United States from Europe. Mayer was appointed rabbi in a well-attended meeting held on July 19, 1874. The members present voted overwhelmingly in favor of hiring Mayer, with the exception of one member who insisted that his negative vote be recorded.

Jewish community leaders Dr. Henry Hochheimer of Oheb Israel Synagogue and Dr. Benjamin Szold of Temple Oheb Shalom alleged that Mayer had been a convert to Christianity who had worked as a missionary in Africa, a charge that Mayer publicly denied during Shabbat morning services while holding onto a Torah scroll. Mayer met privately with William Rayner, a founder of Har Sinai and a notable figure in Baltimore's Jewish community, and told him that he had a near identical twin brother who had been the Christian convert, a fact that Mayer had hoped not to disclose but that he was forced to reveal to explain his innocence. Rayner funded a trip to Europe to allow Mayer to confirm his story, but Mayer went to Canada instead and had an associate in Europe mail letters to Rayner confirming the story. The congregation was split between groups who were wary of the story and those — Rayner among them — who believed Mayer's explanation, many of whom appreciated Mayer's ability to give sermons in both English and German. After a congregational meeting in May 1876 Mayer resigned his position.

David Philipson, who would later serve as rabbi of Har Sinai, recorded in his 1941 autobiography My Life As An American Jew that "the apostate-rabbi became a memory, but there were men even years afterward who raved about the eloquence of Dr. J. M." Rubenstein's 1918 History of Har Sinai Congregation of the city of Baltimore describes Mayer's term as being "not a happy one" and records that some congregants left the synagogue to start services held at the Masonic Temple. However, Rubenstein also recorded that the rabbi "was noted for his eloquence", providing no other details of Mayer's service to the congregation.

== See also ==
- Har Sinai Congregation
