= Eutaw Place Temple =

Historic former Reform Jewish synagogue in Maryland, US

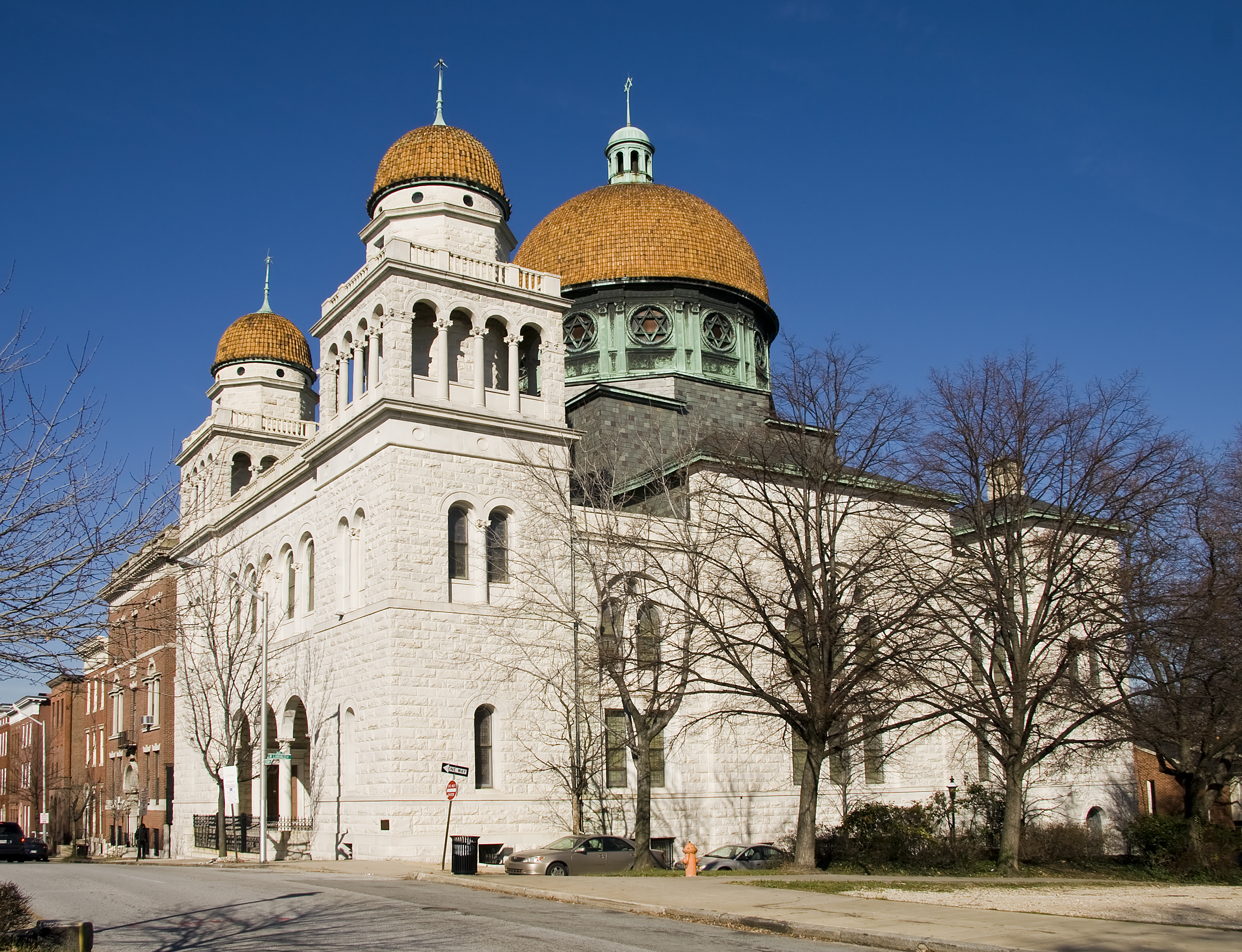
- The former synagogue in 2011, now Prince Hall Grand Lodge

- Location of the former synagogue in Baltimore, Maryland

Religion
- Affiliation: Reform Judaism (former)
- Ecclesiastical or organizational status: Synagogue (1892–1960); Freemasonry hall (since 1960)
- Status: Closed (as a synagogue); Repurposed

Location
- Location: 1307 Eutaw Place, Bolton Hill, Baltimore, Maryland 21217
- Country: United States
- Interactive map of Eutaw Place Temple
- Coordinates: 39°18′15.42″N 76°37′33.38″W

Architecture
- Architect: Joseph Evans Sperry
- Type: Synagogue
- Style: Byzantine Revival
- Established: 1853 (as a congregation)
- Completed: 1892
- Construction cost: $225,000

Specifications
- Capacity: 2,200 worshippers
- Interior area: 82 square feet (7.6 m^{2})
- Dome: Three
- Materials: Marble

Website
- mwphglmd.org (Lodge)
- Eutaw Place Temple
- U.S. Historic district – Contributing property
- Baltimore National Heritage Area
- Part of: Bolton Hill Historic District (ID71001031)

Significant dates
- Designated CP: September 17, 1971
- Designated NHA: March 30, 2009

Eutaw Place Temple is a former Reform Jewish synagogue located at 1307 Eutaw Place in the Bolton Hill neighborhood of Baltimore, Maryland, in the United States.

== History ==
The temple was constructed to serve the German Jewish immigrant community. Originally built as a synagogue for the Temple Oheb Shalom congregation, the property was sold to the Prince Hall Masons in 1960, and is called Prince Hall Grand Lodge. It was built in 1892 as the second home of the Oheb Shalom congregation, and borrows its Byzantine Revival design elements from the Great Synagogue of Florence. Joseph Evans Sperry of Baltimore was the architect.

The exterior is white Beaver Dam marble. The main space is approximately 82 square feet (7.6 m^{2}), capped by a series of vaults and the dome and surrounded by galleries, seating about 2,200 people. The temple originally cost $225,000 to build.

The Eutaw Place Temple is a major contributing structure in the Bolton Hill Historic District, designated by Maryland Historical Trust on September 17, 1971; and a contributing property in the Baltimore National Heritage Area.

== See also ==
- Baltimore Hebrew Congregation Synagogue
- History of the Jews in Baltimore
- Jewish Museum of Maryland
