= William Rosenau =

William Rosenau (1865, Wollstein, Province of Posen, Prussia - 1943, United States) was a leader of Reform Judaism in the beginning of the twentieth century in the United States.

== Biography ==
William Rosenau was born in Wolstein, Germany in 1865, the son of Rabbi Nathan and Johanna (Braun) Rosenau. The family came to the United States and settled in the Philadelphia area when William Rosenau was eleven. He immigrated to the United States in 1876.

He received a B.A. from the University of Cincinnati and a Ph.D. from Johns Hopkins University. He also got rabbinic ordination from Hebrew Union College. He served as rabbi in Omaha, Nebraska and in Congregation Oheb Shalom of Baltimore, Maryland. He was also on the faculty of Johns Hopkins University. Rosenau was considered a "radical reformer" regarding ritual and he was a member of the anti-Zionist American Council for Judaism. He was an editor of the revised editions of the Union Prayer Book and the Union Haggadah.

Much of Rosenau's early education was acquired from his father. The atmosphere of a rabbinic home no doubt influenced Rosenau's decision to enter the rabbinate. He studied at the University of Cincinnati and received his A.B. in 1888. In 1889 he graduated from the Hebrew Union College in Cincinnati nad was ordained as a rabbi. In 1900 he received a Ph.D. from Johns Hopkins University in Baltimore, Maryland. In 1923 he received an honorary degree of Doctor of Hebrew Law from the Hebrew Union College.

After graduation from the seminary, Rosenau served at Temple Israel in Omaha, Nebraska from 1889 to 1892. He then received a call from Baltimore to become rabbi at Congregation Oheb Shalom. He served as the rabbi in Baltimore until 1939, when he became rabbi emeritus. In 1942 he completed his fiftieth consecutive year as rabbi of the congregation. While at Congregation Oheb Shalom he introduction of English prayers and sermons in the place of German, the abolished of the compulsory wearing of hats during services, and introduced the Friday evening service. He also served on the faculty of Johns Hopkins University in the Department of Semitics from 1902 to 1932.

Rosenau was involved in the activities of the general and Jewish communities of Baltimore. He was a member of the Baltimore School Board from 1900 to 1910 and served with the Maryland Society for the Study and Prevention of Tuberculosis. He was a member of a commission that made a studied of state-aided colleges in Maryland, served on the Board of the Prisoners Aid Association and was a member of Maryland Commission for the Higher Education of Negroes. He served on the board of the Associated Jewish Charities and was its director for a time. He was a secretary of the Central Conference of American Rabbis and later served as president from 1916 to 1918. He was a founder of the Jewish Welfare Board, a member of the Board of Jewish Education, the Union of American Hebrew Congregations, and the Board of Governors of the Hebrew Union College from 1917 to 1943. He served for several years as chancellor of the Jewish Chautauqua Society.

He contributed a number of articles to the Jewish Encyclopedia, and translated Esther for the Jewish Publication Society of America. In addition to numerous articles in periodicals, Rosenau also wrote several books.

== Selected works ==
=== Books ===
Jewish Ceremonial Institutions and Customs

- Hebraisms in the Authorized Version of the Bible (1901)
- Jewish Ceremonial Institutions and Customs (1903, 1925)
- Jewish Biblical Commentators (1904)
- The Seder Haggada (1905)
- Jewish Education (1912)
- Book of Consolation (1914)
- The Rabbi in Action (1937)

== Personal life ==
Rosenau was married twice. He married his first wife, Mabel Hellman, in 1893. They had two children, William H. and Marguerite (nee Kiefer). Mabel died in 1923. Rosenau married Myra Krause in 1925. Rabbi William Rosenau died in December 1943.

== See also ==
- History of the Jews in Maryland
  - History of the Jews in Baltimore
- Congregation Oheb Shalom
