= Har Sinai – Oheb Shalom Congregation =

Reform Jewish synagogue in Baltimore, Maryland, US

- Location on the north-western edge of greater Baltimore, Maryland

Religion
- Affiliation: Reform Judaism
- Ecclesiastical or organisational status: Synagogue
- Leadership: Rabbi Dr. Rachel S. Beit-Halachmi
- Status: Active

Location
- Location: 7310 Park Heights Avenue, Pikesville, Baltimore County, Maryland 21208
- Country: United States
- Coordinates: 39°22′10″N 76°42′38″W

Architecture
- Architects: 1960: Sheldon I. Leavitt; Walter Gropius
- Type: Synagogue
- Established: 2019 (merged congregation): 1842 (as Har Sinai); 1853 (as Oheb Shalom)
- Completed: Har Sinai: 1849; 1938; 1959; 2002 (Owings Mills); Oheb Shalom: 1892 (Eutaw Place); 1960 (Park Heights Avenue)

Website
- hsosc-baltimore.org

Har Sinai – Oheb Shalom Congregation (transliterated from Hebrew as "Mount Sinai - Lovers of Peace Congregation") is a Reform Jewish congregation and synagogue located at 7310 Park Heights Avenue, in Pikesville, Baltimore County, Maryland, in the United States. Established in 1842 in Baltimore and known as Har Sinai Congregation, and in 1853 near Camden Yards as Temple Oheb Shalom, the two congregations merged in 2019 and is the oldest Reform congregation in the United States that has used the same prayer rite since its inception.

== History of Har Sinai Congregation ==
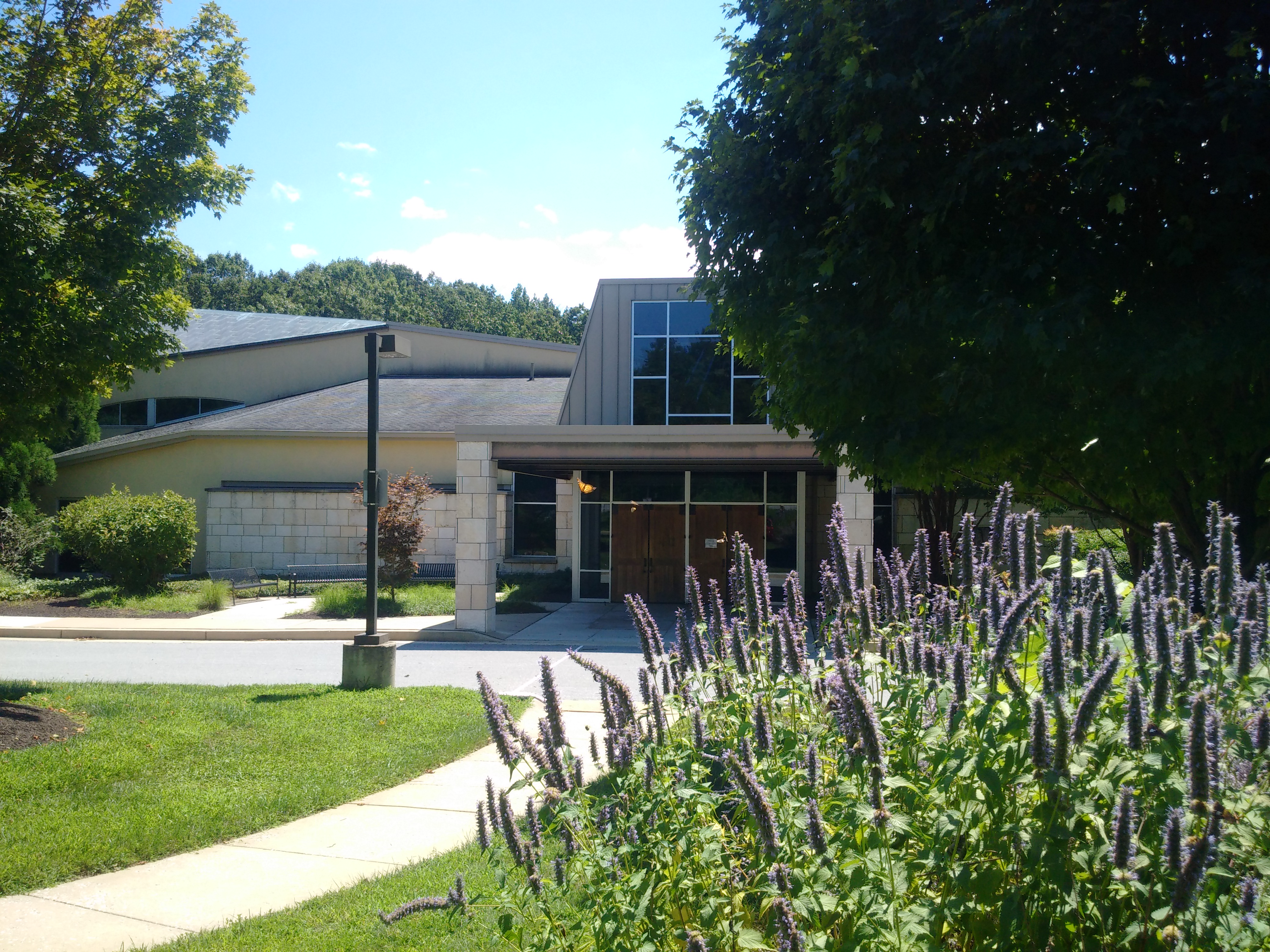
Former synagogue of Har Sinai Congregation built in 2001 at Owings Mills

Many of the original congregants of Har Sinai Congregation came from what was then the Orthodox Congregation Nidchei Yisroel (later known as the Baltimore Hebrew Congregation), after Rabbi Abraham Rice protested against the performance of Masonic rites at the funeral service of one of its members. The synagogue was originally known as the Har Sinai Verein (Society).

Rabbi David Philipson credited, in 1907, Har Sinai as "the first congregation organized as a reformed congregation" when it was established in 1842. The synagogue adopted Seder ha-'Abodah ("Order of Devotion"), the siddur (prayer book) formulated by the Hamburg Temple, the first reform synagogue in Germany, and services were led by the members. Abram Hutzler, founder of the business that became the progenitor of Hutzler's department store and whose father, Moses Hutzler, was a co-founder of Har Sinai, described Har Sinai's earliest practices as "almost orthodox, with covered heads, the separation of the sexes, and the use of 'a Shabbos goy' to light the fires." Later, as part of the congregation's rituals, services were conducted in both Hebrew and English, music was played, and women participated together with men. The first prayer services were held in May 1842 at the residence of Moses Hutzler on Exeter Street and Eastern Avenue, above the store that operated on the ground floor. "In 1849, the Congregation built its own temple on High Street in Baltimore and acquired a cemetery."

The synagogue purchased a 17-acre (69,000 m^{2}) property in the northwestern neighborhood of Park Heights from the Maryland Country Club, with a new synagogue dedicated in 1938. A $1 million fundraising program was begun in 1953 by Rabbi Abraham Shusterman. A design modeled on Cleveland's Park Synagogue was created, and following groundbreaking in September 1957, the new structure, the Congregation's fourth home, which had seating for 600 and able to accommodate 2,200 for High Holy Days services, was first used in June 1959. During the 1950s, Shusterman was a regular panelist on the weekly television program To Promote Goodwill, an interfaith discussion of social and religious issues by clergy representing Jewish, Catholic, and Protestant views, produced by WBAL-TV and broadcast worldwide on the Voice of America. Owings Mills was chosen as the site of a satellite Hebrew school in 1988 and a 60,000-square-foot (5,600 m^{2}) structure was completed there in 2002.

=== Rabbinical leaders ===
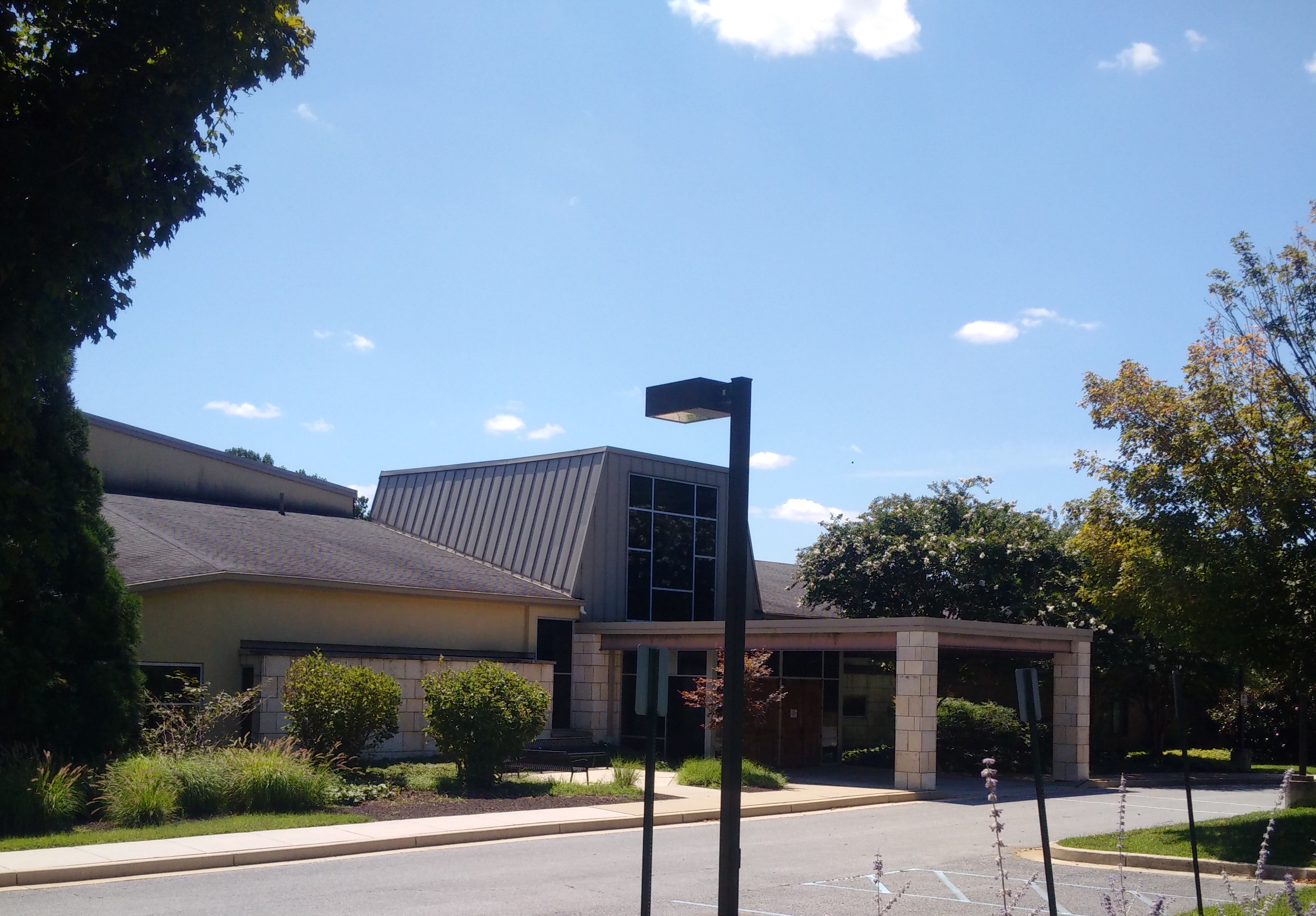
The former Har Sinai synagogue.

German-born Rabbi David Einhorn was named on September 29, 1855, as the congregation's first rabbi. Einhorn formulated the Olat Tamid siddur for use in services, which became one of the models for the Union Prayer Book published in 1894 by the Central Conference of American Rabbis. He also founded "Sinai", a German-language newspaper created to promote the Reform movement. In 1861, Einhorn delivered a sermon in which he argued against the institution of slavery in the South as being inconsistent with Jewish values, noting the Jewish experience as slaves in Egypt, despite the fact that many people in the congregation were sympathetic to slavery in what was then a slave state. A riot broke out in response to his sermon on April 19, 1861, during which the mob sought to tar and feather the rabbi. Einhorn fled to Philadelphia, where he became the spiritual leader of the Reform Congregation Keneseth Israel.

Rabbi Solomon Deutsch served as rabbi from 1862 to 1874. Reverend Dr. Jacob Mayer was appointed as rabbi in 1874, though he was forced to leave the congregation two years later amid allegations that he had previously converted to Christianity and been a missionary in Africa. Rabbi Emil G. Hirsch, son-in-law of Rabbi Einhorn, succeeded Mayer as rabbi, serving in the position in 1877 and 1878. Samuel Sale was hired in 1878 as the congregation's fifth rabbi and the first to be born in the United States. After receiving his rabbinic ordination in 1883 as one of the first four graduates of Hebrew Union College, Rabbi David Philipson was named as Har Sinai's rabbi in 1884 and served in the position until 1888. Rabbi Tobias Schanfarber then served from 1888 to 1898.

From 1920 to 1922, the rabbi was Louis Bernstein. He died suddenly, after being ill for several months. Prior to his death, he had become one of the first Jewish clergy members to give a radio talk. He gave a "wireless sermon" over local amateur radio station 3RM on November 20, 1921. Rabbi Edward L. Israel was installed as Har Sinai's rabbi in late August 1923. Rabbi Israel also embraced broadcasting and was heard on the radio on numerous occasions in the mid-1920s. Rabbi Israel served for 18 years before being elected as President of the Synagogue Council of America.

Floyd L. Herman served as the congregation's rabbi from 1981 to 2003, and subsequently as Rabbi Emeritus. Benjamin Sharff, who was ordained at Hebrew Union College-Jewish Institute of Religion, served as rabbi from 2010 until the congregation's merger in 2019.

== History of Temple Oheb Shalom ==
The Oheb Shalom congregation was founded in 1853 by Jewish immigrants from German Confederation member states, Hungary, and Czech territories; pioneer Reform rabbi Isaac Mayer Wise had considerable influence on the congregation's establishment. Its first home was on Hanover Street near Camden Yards.

Benjamin Szold was rabbi from 1859 to 1892; his daughter Henrietta Szold was the founder of Hadassah. Szold had a moderating effect on the march of Oheb Shalom toward Reform practice. He encouraged Sabbath observance and replaced Wise's Minhag America with his own traditional Abodat Yisroel siddur. William Rosenau succeeded him (1892–1940).

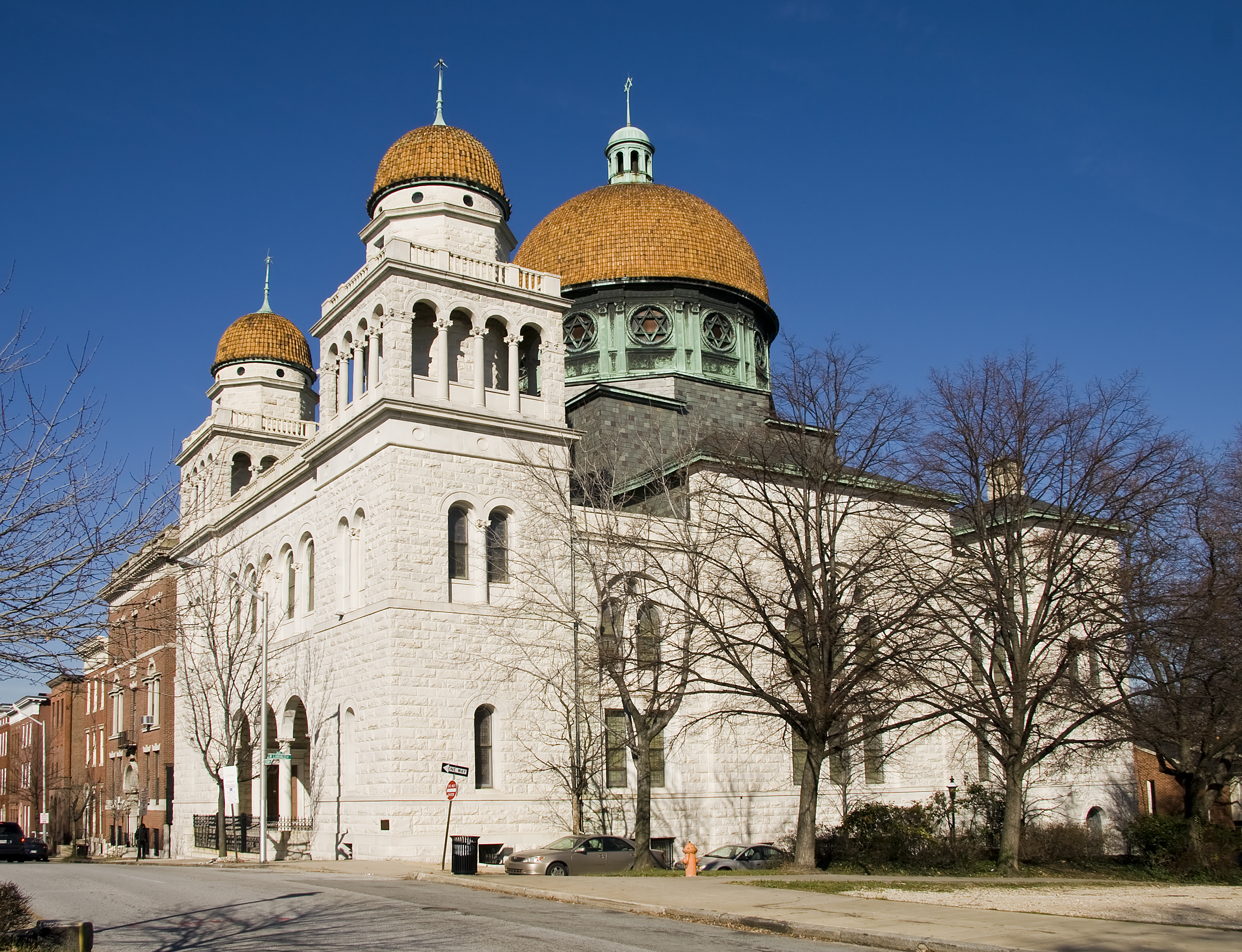
Former Eutaw Place Temple, now Freemasonry hall

In 1892 the congregation built the Eutaw Place Temple, designed by architect Joseph Evans Sperry who modeled it after the Great Synagogue of Florence in the Byzantine Revival style. The congregation sold the building to the Prince Hall Masons in 1961.

In 1953 the congregation acquired land in Pikesville, and, in 1960, finished construction of its building on Park Heights Avenue, designed by Sheldon I. Leavitt with consulting architect Walter Gropius. The design is dominated by four large vaults and Gropius saw the design as a modern combination of "the turbine with the Torah." Gropius' design also had an atypical design, with the sanctuary floor ascending toward the bimah on the eastern wall; this design was later reversed so that the floor descends toward the bimah on the western wall.

== See also ==
- History of the Jews in Maryland
