= David Einhorn (rabbi) =

19th-century German Reform rabbi

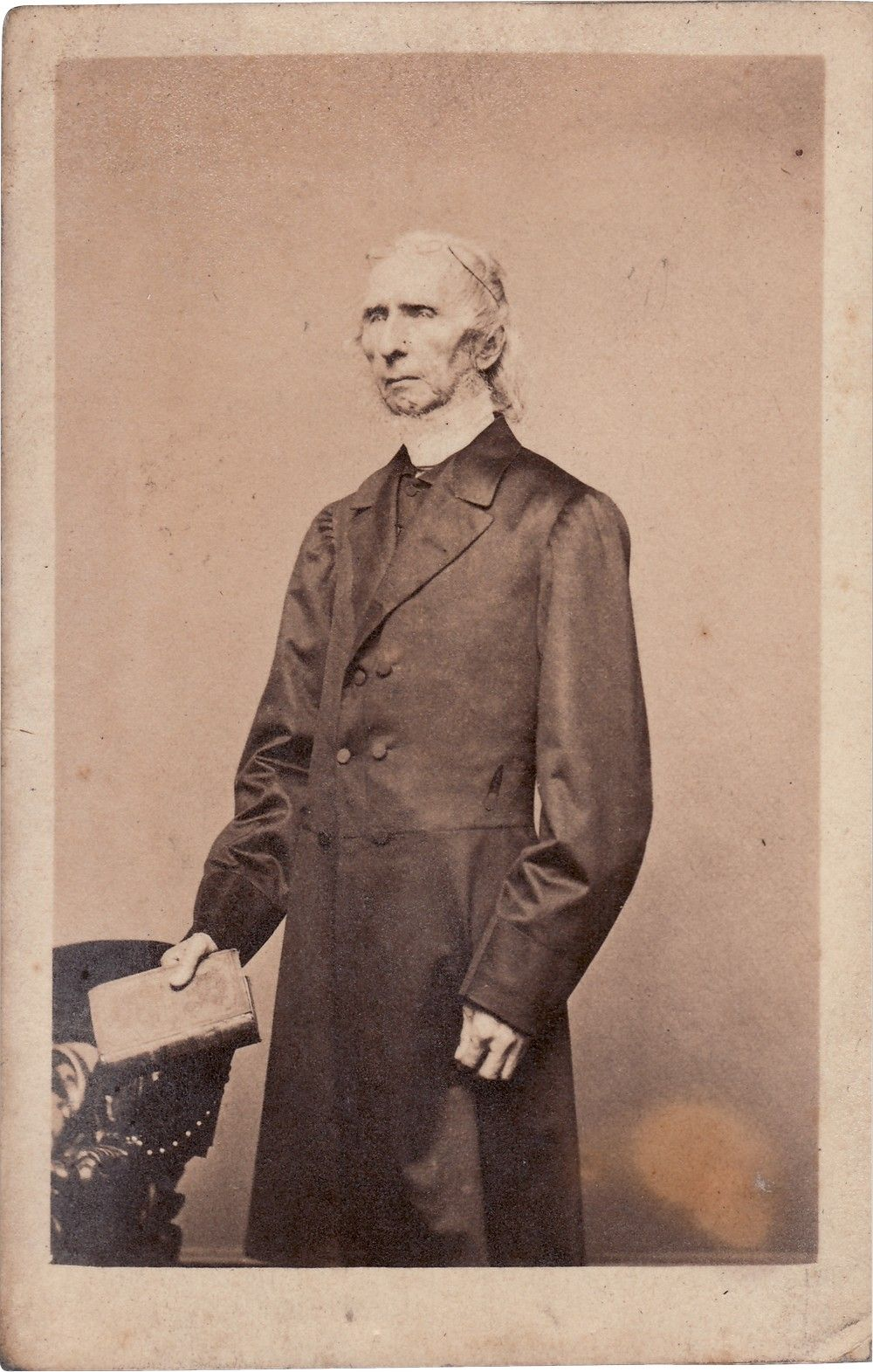
- Carte de visite c. 1855
- Born: November 10, 1809 (2 Kislev 5570); Diespeck, Kingdom of Bavaria
- Died: November 2, 1879 (aged 69) (16 Cheshvan 5640); New York City, United States
- Education: University of Erlangen–Nuremberg, Ludwig-Maximilians-Universität München, University of Würzburg
- Occupation: rabbi

David Einhorn (10 November 1809 – 2 November 1879) was a German rabbi and leader of Reform Judaism in the United States. In 1855, he became the first rabbi of the Har Sinai Congregation in Baltimore, the oldest Jewish-American congregation affiliated with the Reform movement since its inception. While there, he created an early American prayer book for the congregation that became one of the progenitors of the 1894 Union Prayer Book.

Writing and preaching in German, rabbi Einhorn denounced slavery as a moral evil, rebutting the pro-slavery theology of rabbi Morris Jacob Raphall. In April 1861, after preaching a sermon against slavery, Einhorn was driven out of Baltimore by a pro-slavery mob. He fled to Philadelphia and became rabbi of Reform Congregation Keneseth Israel. In 1866, he moved to New York City, where he became rabbi of Congregation Adath Israel.

== Early years ==
He was born in Diespeck, Kingdom of Bavaria, on November 10, 1809. He studied at the yeshiva in Fürth where he excelled, earning his rabbinical diploma at age 17. Einhorn then studied at the University of Erlangen–Nuremberg, the Ludwig-Maximilians-Universität München, and the University of Würzburg from 1828 to 1834, supported by his mother following the death of his father. In 1844 he married Julia Henriette Ochs, and the couple had four children.

== Beliefs ==
Supporting the principles of Abraham Geiger, Einhorn favored presenting Hebrew prayers in vernacular German, and eliminating prayers to restore the Jewish state and Temple in Jerusalem; yet he insisted on emphasizing messianistic hope. He argued for those views at the rabbinical conference in Frankfurt in 1845. "The collapse of Israel's political independence was once regarded as a misfortune", observed Einhorn. "But it really represented progress: not atrophy, but an elevation of religion. Henceforth, Israel came closer to its destiny. Holy devotion replaced sacrifices. Israel was to bear the word of God to all the corners of the earth."

Einhorn was chosen Landesrabbiner of the Birkenfeld at Hoppstädten, and afterward Landesrabbiner of Mecklenburg-Schwerin in 1847, succeeding Rabbi Samuel Holdheim, whose views were a major influence on Einhorn. An incident in which he blessed an uncircumcised boy, which upset many of his more traditional congregants, led to his departure from Germany. He was called to Pest, Hungary, in 1851, where his views met with such opposition that the Emperor of Austria ordered his temple closed only two months after his arrival. The Emperor saw a connection between the Jewish reform movement and the Revolutions of 1848.

== Emigration ==
Einhorn immigrated to the United States and was named on 29 September 1855, as the first rabbi of the Har Sinai Congregation in Baltimore. In that role, Einhorn formulated the Olat Tamid siddur for use in services, which became one of the models for the Union Prayer Book published in 1894 by the Central Conference of American Rabbis. Olat Tamid contrasted with Isaac Mayer Wise's Minhag America in particular by removing references to the status of Jews as a chosen people and eliminating references to the restoration of sacrificial services in the Temple.

== Reform Judaism ==
Einhorn was an opponent of the Cleveland Conference of 1855 and its decision that the Talmud had primacy in interpreting the Torah. In this stand, Einhorn stood in contrast to Rabbi Wise's efforts to find language that could accommodate the various strands of Judaism in the United States, arguing that such efforts betrayed the progress of reform. In 1856, he started publishing a German-language monthly magazine, Sinai, devoted to radical Jewish reform, which he also used as a platform for his antislavery pronouncements, which led to the magazine's failure in early 1863. Einhorn remained an opponent of interfaith marriage, arguing in Sinai that such practices were "a nail in the coffin of the small Jewish race", though he opposed the retention of practices such as the wearing of phylacteries, the limitations on activity prohibited on the Sabbath, and kosher dietary laws, all of which he viewed as outmoded. Only those portions of the Torah that derived from a moral foundation were to be retained. He became the acknowledged leader of Reform Judaism in America, and in 1858 he published a revised prayer book, which formed the model for later revisions.

== Denunciation of slavery ==
In 1861, Einhorn rebutted a sermon by rabbi Morris Jacob Raphall that supported the existence of slavery. “Is slavery a moral evil or not?” wrote Einhorn in Sinai. “… It took Dr. Raphall, a Jewish preacher, to concoct the deplorable farce in the name of divine authority, to proclaim the justification, the moral blamelessness of servitude, and to lay down the law to Christian preachers of opposite convictions. The Jew, a descendant of the race that offers daily praises to God for deliverance out of the house of bondage in Egypt, and even today suffers under the yoke of slavery in most places of the old world…undertook to designate slavery as a perfectly sinless institution, sanctioned by God!"”

Rabbi Einhorn passionately denounced slavery in the face of many of his congregants and colleagues who supported slavery in what was then a slave state, Maryland. In his sermon titled "War on Amalek", based on Exodus 17, Einhorn declared: "We are told that this crime [slavery] rests upon a historical right!... Slavery is an institution sanctioned by the Bible, hence war against it is war against, and not for, God! It has ever been a strategy of the advocate of a bad cause to take refuge from the spirit of the Bible to its letter." A riot broke out in response to his sermon on 19 April 1861, in which the mob sought to tar and feather the rabbi. Einhorn fled to Philadelphia where he became spiritual leader of Congregation Keneseth Israel.

== Retirement ==
In 1866, he moved to New York City, where he became the inaugural rabbi of Congregation Adas Jeshurun on 39th Street, which merged with Congregation Ansche Chesed in 1873, adopted the new name Congregation Beth-El, and built a new structure on 63rd Street. Einhorn retained the position as spiritual leader of the merged synagogue, delivering his final sermon on 12 July 1879, after which the congregation agreed to bestow upon him a pension of $3,500 (~$120,937 in 2025). Upon his retirement, Einhorn was recognized across denominations by his fellow rabbis; at a farewell ceremony held at his apartment (at his request, because of his health) he was presented with a resolution adopted at the convention of the Union of American Hebrew Congregations, that recognized Einhorn for his rabbinic service, noting the "ability and character which have marked his career, and the earnestness, honesty and zeal which have animated the heart of a man whom we proudly recognize as one of Israel's purest champions and noblest teachers." He died four months later.

== Death ==
Einhorn died of old age on 2 November 1879, at his home on East 64th Street. He was 69, and had become increasingly feeble and unable to leave his room. His funeral was held before a packed house at Beth-El on 6 November 1879, where his plain coffin was carried into the synagogue by 12 pallbearers and placed before the pulpit. Attending were such rabbinic notables as Richard James Horatio Gottheil of Congregation Emanu-El, Einhorn's son-in-law and successor Kaufmann Kohler of Beth-El, another son-in-law, Emil G. Hirsch, of Louisville, Kentucky, along with representatives of the congregations he served in Baltimore and Philadelphia. He was buried at Machpelah Cemetery, near the Jackie Robinson Parkway.

== Sources ==
- Wilson, J. G.; Fiske, J., eds. (1900). "Einhorn, David" . Appletons' Cyclopædia of American Biography. New York: D. Appleton.
