= Lillie Carroll Jackson House =

- U.S. National Register of Historic Places
- Location within Baltimore Location within Maryland Location within the United States
- Location: 1320 Eutaw Place., Baltimore, Maryland
- Coordinates: 39.304723°N 76.627048°W
- Area: less than one acre
- Built: 1868
- Architectural style: Italianate
- MPS: Civil Rights in Baltimore, Maryland, 1831-1976
- NRHP reference No.: 100008816
- Added to NRHP: April 13, 2023

Lillie Carroll Jackson House, is a historic rowhouse located at Baltimore, Maryland, United States. It was built about 1868, and is a three-story, brick dwelling on a raised basement. It features Italianate-style detailing. It was the home of Lillie Carroll Jackson, who served as president of the Baltimore NAACP from 1935 to 1970. The home was rehabilitated between 2008 and 2012, and reopened in 2016 as the Lillie Carroll Jackson Civil Rights Museum.

It was listed on the National Register of Historic Places in 2023. It is located in the Bolton Hill Historic District.
