= Emil G. Hirsch =

American Reform movement rabbi (1851–1923)

Emil Gustav Hirsch
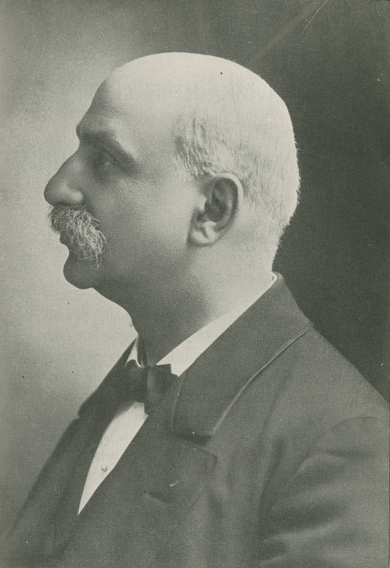
- Born: May 22, 1851; Luxembourg City, Luxembourg
- Died: January 7, 1923 (aged 71); United States
- Education: University of Pennsylvania
- Occupation: Reform rabbi
- Spouse(s): Mathilda Einhorn, daughter of David Einhorn
- Parent: Samuel Hirsch

Signature
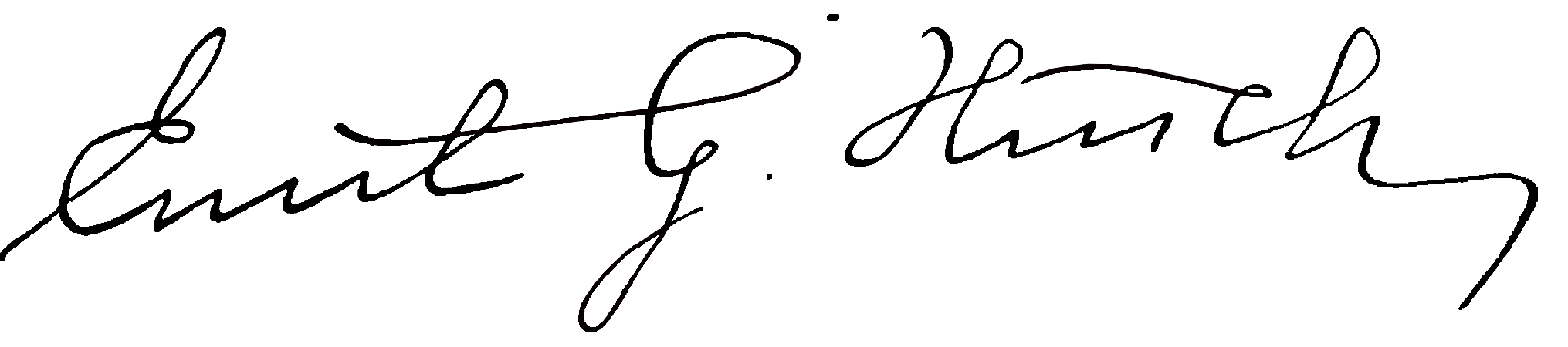

Emil Gustav Hirsch (May 22, 1851 – January 7, 1923) was a Luxembourgish-born Jewish American biblical scholar, Reform rabbi, contributing editor to numerous articles of The Jewish Encyclopedia (1906), and founding member of the NAACP.

== Biography ==
Emil Gustav Hirsch was born in Luxembourg City, a son of the rabbi and philosopher Samuel Hirsch on May 22, 1851. He later married the daughter of Rabbi David Einhorn. He studied at the University of Pennsylvania, and in 1872 went to Berlin for postgraduate work. He was rabbi at Har Sinai Congregation in Baltimore (1877–78), and in Louisville, Kentucky (1878–80). But he did his greatest work in Chicago.

For forty-two years (1880–1923), Hirsch served as the rabbi of Chicago Sinai Congregation, one of the oldest synagogues in the Midwest. At this post, he became well known for his emphasis on social justice. From Chicago Sinai's pulpit, he delivered rousing sermons on the social ills of the day, and many Chicagoans, Jews and Gentiles alike, were in attendance.

Appointed professor of rabbinical literature and philosophy at the University of Chicago in 1892, Hirsch also served on the Chicago Public Library board from 1885 to 1897. He took an active in politics as a member of the Republican Party. He was a presidential elector in the 1896 presidential election.

He was an influential exponent of advanced thought and Reform Judaism. He edited Der Zeitgeist (Milwaukee, 1880–82) and the Reform Advocate (1891–1923). He also edited the Department of the Bible of the Jewish Encyclopedia and contributed feminist articles to The American Jewess. He also wrote studies of the historical relationship between Judaism and Christianity, including appreciations of its founding figures Jesus and Paul. In addition, he published a number of articles in the Reform Advocate, a weekly journal that he edited for thirty years.

From 1872 to 1876, he studied at the Universities of Berlin and Leipzig. Returning to America, he married Mathilda Einhorn in Louisville, Kentucky. He remained until his death on January 7, 1923.

Hirsch left a legacy as a renowned preacher in American Jewry. Many scholarly articles in the Jewish Encyclopedia were contributed by him. His social and philanthropic pursuits were a valuable contribution.

Hirsch is the namesake of the Emil G. Hirsch Metropolitan High School of Communications, located in the Greater Grand Crossing neighborhood in Chicago. In keeping with his interest in education, Hirsch advised a wealthy congregant, Julius Rosenwald of Sears, Roebuck & Co., to use part of his wealth to help build public schools for black students in the segregated South; their facilities were consistently underfunded. The rural school building program, based on the use of matching funds from local communities, was one of the largest programs, though not the only one, administered by the Rosenwald Fund.

He was the maternal grandfather of U.S. Attorney General Edward Hirsch Levi.

== See also ==
- History of the Jews in Maryland
  - History of the Jews in Baltimore
- History of the Jews in Illinois
  - History of the Jews in Chicago
- Jews in the civil rights movement
- Reform Judaism
- Luxembourgish Jews
- Luxembourg-American

== Sources ==
- Chicago Portraits
- Gilman, D. C.; Peck, H. T.; Colby, F. M., eds. (1905). "Hirsch, Emil Gustav" . New International Encyclopedia (1st ed.). New York: Dodd, Mead.
- Brinkmann, Tobias (2012). Sundays at Sinai: A Jewish Congregation in Chicago. Chicago: University of Chicago Press. ISBN 9780226074542.
- Hirsch, Emil G. (April 1895). "The Modern Jewess". The American Jewess. 1 (1): 10–11.

http://americanjewisharchives.org/publications/journal/PDF/1952_04_02_00_martin.pdf
