= Baltimore Hebrew Congregation Synagogue =

Building in Baltimore, Maryland, US

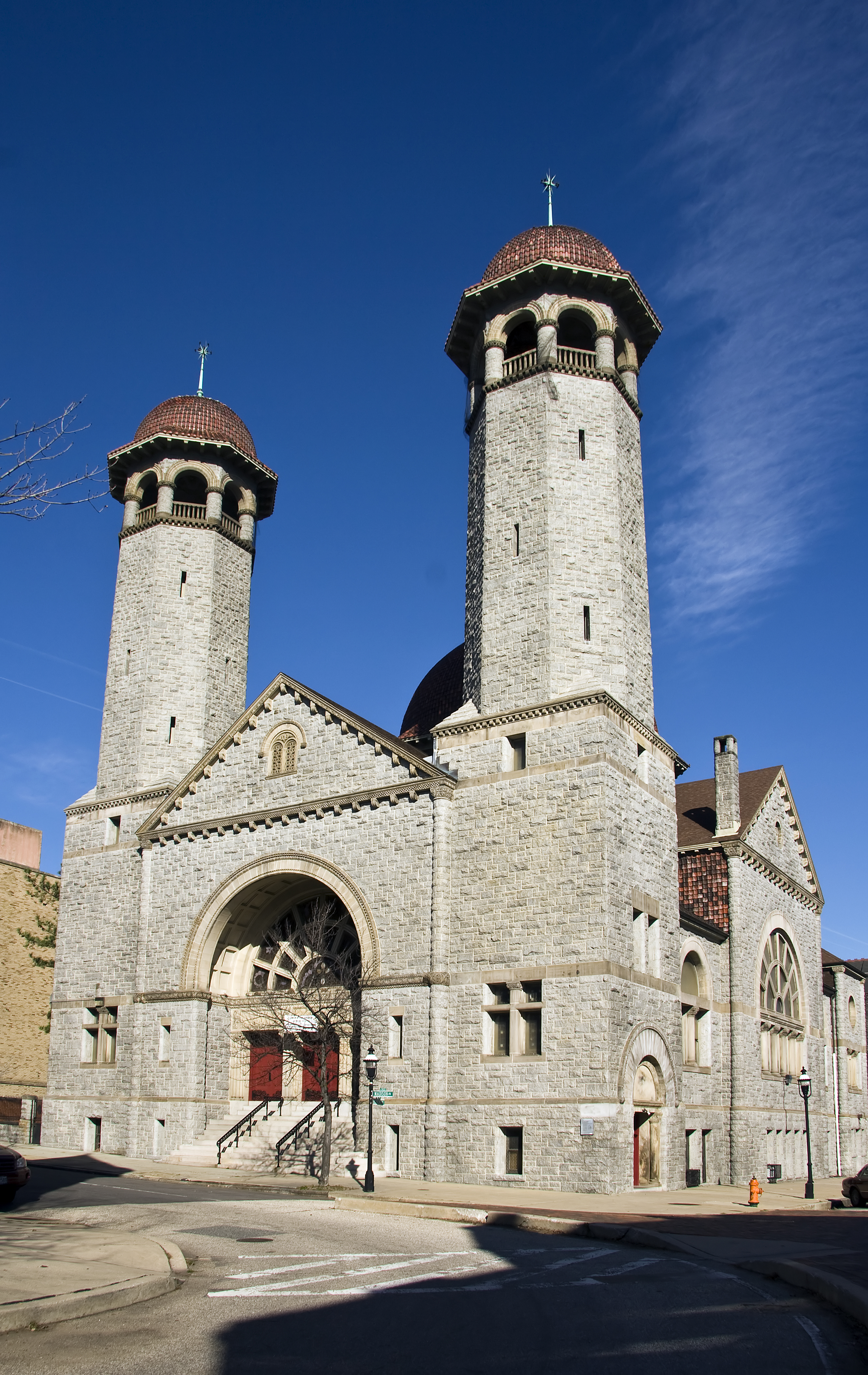
- The stone building in 2011, as a church

- Location of the former synagogue, now church, in Baltimore, Maryland

Religion
- Affiliation: Reform Judaism (former)
- Ecclesiastical or organisational status: Synagogue (1890–c. 1950); Church (since 1950)
- Status: Closed (as a synagogue); Repurposed (as a church)

Location
- Location: 1901 Madison Avenue, Madison Park, Baltimore, Maryland
- Country: United States
- Coordinates: 39°18′29″N 76°37′59″W

Architecture
- Architect: Charles L. Carson
- Type: Synagogue
- Style: Late 19th And 20th Century Revivals, Byzantine
- Established: (as a congregation)
- Completed: 1890

Specifications
- Dome: Three
- Dome dia. (outer): 40 feet (12 m) (central dome)
- Materials: Granite
- Baltimore Hebrew Congregation Synagogue
- U.S. National Register of Historic Places
- Area: 0.3 acres (0.12 ha)
- NRHP reference No.: 76002181
- Added to NRHP: November 07, 1976

Baltimore Hebrew Congregation Synagogue is an historic former Reform Jewish synagogue building located in the Madison Park neighborhood of Baltimore, Maryland, in the United States.

The former synagogue, built as an early place of worship of the Baltimore Hebrew Congregation, is built of ashlar gray granite from Port Deposit. It is a well-executed Byzantine Revival building, designed by Charles L. Carson, a Baltimore architect. It features a large central dome, 40 feet (12 m) in diameter, resting on a high octagonal drum pierced by rectangular windows of stained glass and two tall octagonal towers flanking the main entrance.

Baltimore Hebrew Congregation Synagogue was listed on the National Register of Historic Places in 1976, and lies within the Madison Park Historic District, however outside the Baltimore National Heritage Area.

The building was acquired by the Berea Temple Seventh-day Adventist Church in 1960, and repurposed as a church.

== See also ==
- Baltimore Hebrew Congregation
- Eutaw Place Temple
- History of the Jews in Baltimore
- Jewish Museum of Maryland
