= Joseph Parnes =

American musician (born 1946)

- Born: November 23, 1946 (age 79); Kermanshah, Iran
- Citizenship: American
- Education: University of Louisiana at Lafayette
- Occupations: Founder and CEO, Technomart Investment Advisors
- Years active: 1979–present
- Website: Technomart Investment Advisors

Joseph Parnes (born November 23, 1946) is an American businessperson and registered investment advisor notable for his involvement in short selling. He is president of Technomart Investment Advisors and editor of the market letter Shortex. His investment strategy is known to be contrarian in nature and is a regular contributor to Forbes and Futures Magazine. His short strategy was expressly referenced in Barron's feature article "Now a Word From the Dark Side".

== Early years ==
Parnes was born in 1946 in Iran to a Persian Jewish family. He is the fourth and youngest child. Both of his parents died when he was 12, leaving him on his own and forcing him to take on multiple jobs to support himself, including being a taxi driver. Parnes then emigrated to the U.S. to study electrical engineering at the University of Louisiana at Lafayette. There he struggled to support himself while in school, and found himself working and sleeping at nights at the local Catholic hospital in Lafayette, Louisiana. Once he graduated, he moved to New York City and began work at Western Electric, part of AT&T. The early 1970s were detrimental to the stock market, as a result of the Watergate scandal and the oil shortage. This is when Parnes found short positions to be an asset in developing a successful stock portfolio.

== Professional career ==
In 1979, Parnes founded Technomart Investment Advisors, which develops custom accounts for both individual and institutional investors. He also created Shortex, a market letter which selects seven long and seven short positions. Parnes is currently president of the firm, directing all research, analysis, and corporate strategy. He is responsible for supplying the firm's private and institutional clients with actionable investment advice. He has experience across an array of industries, with a special focus on growth companies. Parnes' focus on short-selling has led to controversy with companies such as American Home Mortgage and Hansen Natural for his public declaration with the CEO on Bloomberg TV of impending devaluation.

== Accomplishments ==
As of 2018, Parnes had over $220 million, and was included in Barron's Top Investment Advisor Money Poll. Technomart Investment Advisors was recognized as one of the top wealth managers by Bloomberg Wealth Manager from 2004 to 2012. Parnes was highlighted in the "Baltimore Business Journal" for not losing money in 2008. He was a featured speaker at Reuters Advice Point in 2007, and was asked to provide his input on short-selling to the Financial Markets Law Committee c/o Bank of England via the Supreme Court of the United Kingdom in 2011. He has been featured regularly in media including Barron's, Investor's Business Daily, Futures Magazine, Forbes, Bloomberg, CNBC, and formerly the Nightly Business Report.

In 2020 Joseph Parnes released his first book, Short Selling for the Long Term. The book focuses on leveraging short selling to increase long positions.
