= Congregation Tiferes Yisroel =

Orthodox Jewish synagogue in Baltimore, Maryland, US

Congregation Tiferes Yisroel – Beis Dovid
- Hebrew: תפארת ישראל בית דוד
- Exterior of Congregation Tiferes Yisroel

- Location in Baltimore

Religion
- Affiliation: Orthodox Judaism
- Rite: Nusach Sefard
- Ecclesiastical or organisational status: Synagogue
- Leadership: Rabbi Menachem Goldberger
- Status: Active

Location
- Location: 6201 Park Heights Avenue, Baltimore, Maryland
- Country: United States
- Coordinates: 39°21′30″N 76°41′34.5″W

Architecture
- Established: 1986 (as a congregation)
- Completed: 1994

Website
- tiferesyisroel.org

Congregation Tiferes Yisroel – Beis Dovid (Hebrew: תפארת ישראל בית דוד), also known as Rabbi Goldberger's Shul, is an Orthodox Jewish congregation and synagogue located at 6201 Park Heights Avenue, Baltimore, Maryland, in the United States. The congregation's rabbi is Rabbi Menachem Goldberger.

== History ==
Rabbi Menachem Goldberger

Congregation Tiferes Yisroel was founded in 1986 by twelve families and individuals in Baltimore, who invited Rabbi Menachem Goldberger, a native of Denver, to be their rabbi. The congregation initially met in a private home, hosting 126 people at their first Rosh Hashanah services; after about nine months, when membership had increased to over 70 families, the congregation purchased what had been the B'nai Akiva building in Baltimore. In 1993 the synagogue bought its present home on Park Heights Avenue, into which it moved in 1994. As of its 25th anniversary in 2011, the congregation numbered 140 families.

The congregation is not affiliated with any of the various umbrella Orthodox organizations, but is a Hasidic shtiebel with Haredi leanings. Prayer services are conducted in Nusach Sefard. Goldberger draws his inspiration as a Hasidic rabbi from the teachings of Rabbi Shlomo Twerski, of whom he was a close student. The congregation emphasizes music and singing as a vehicle for religious worship. Goldberger has released a compilation of his own, original religious compositions, called L'cha Dodi.

Other areas of specific emphasis are the importance of family, the Land of Israel, and the lifelong goal of Torah study. The congregation welcomes all Jews, especially those who were not raised in the Orthodox Jewish tradition, such as Baalei teshuva or converts to Judaism.

In conjunction with the synagogue's 25th anniversary in 2011, the Mayor and City Council of Baltimore proclaimed March 13, 2011 as "Rabbi Menachem Goldberger Day".

== Bitcoin ==
In May 2013 Tiferes Yisroel became the only American religious institution to accept bitcoin for dues, donations, and other payments. Over a period of nine months, the synagogue collected 1.98 bitcoins, worth approximately $1,253. The congregation stopped accepting bitcoin in March 2014 following the collapse of the Mt. Gox bitcoin exchange.

== See also ==
- History of the Jews in Maryland
