= Minhag America =

Reform Jewish prayer book

- Author: Isaac Mayer Wise
- Language: English and Hebrew
- Subject: Prayer book
- Genre: Reform Jewish siddur
- Publication date: 1857
- Followed by: Union Prayer Book

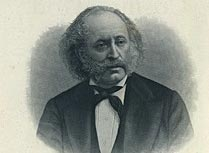
Rabbi Isaac Mayer Wise, from The Cosmic God, 1876

Minhag America is a siddur created in 1857 by Rabbi Isaac Mayer Wise that was intended to address conflict between sides supporting and opposing traditionalism in early Reform Judaism in the United States. The prayer book was accepted by the majority of Reform congregations in the western and southern United States.

The roots of the prayer book date back to a program he laid out in The Occident (vol. 5, p. 109) in which Wise described how "the strength of Israel is divided, because the emigrant brings his own Minhag from his home", a problem that could be addressed by a uniquely American Minhag that would provide a synthesis that all could use. In the May 1847 issue of The Occident, Wise described how American Jews had come "from different countries, and, brought with them diverse Minhagim; and this circumstance must always prove a source of confusion and disagreement in the various Synagogues" and that the need to create a new Minhag was to "bring unity among... all the American Synagogues" and to "uphold the Word of the Living God... in the free country of America", without "the desire for innovation, nor the thirst for fame, nor a giddy disposition for reform".

In his 1919 work Centenary Papers and Others, Rabbi David Philipson describes how Wise's use of the title Minhag America was deliberately intended to show that his prayer book was superseding the "Minhag Ashkenaz", "Minhag Sefard" and "Minhag Polin" (the German, Ḥassidic, and Polish traditions, respectively) that immigrants to the United States had arrived with, and was intended to become a vernacular for prayer that they could all share.

In 1857, he published in Cincinnati a pair of prayer books titled Minhag America, T'fillot B'nai Yeshurun, both with Hebrew text, and one translated into English and the other into German (titled Gebet-Buch fur den offentlichen Gottesdienst und die Privat-Andacht – Prayer Book for Public and Private Worship). Largely retaining the format of the traditional siddur, Wise made modifications to reflect "the wants and demands of time", including changing the Hebrew word goel (redeemer) to geulah (redemption), reflecting a removal of references to a personal Messiah. The prayer book retained many portions of the traditional Hebrew language text, while adding concise and accurate translations in English. Minhag America eliminated calls for a return to Israel and the rebuilding of the Temple in Jerusalem, the reinstitution of sacrifices and the restoration of the priesthood and the Davidic dynasty. References to resurrection were changed to reflect a spiritual immortality.

When the Central Conference of American Rabbis released the Union Prayer Book in the 1890s, Wise had his own congregation abandon the siddur he had formulated and adopt the UPB, an act that Philipson described as "a remarkable act of self abnegation". Wise's example led many other congregations that had been using Minhag America to accept the switch to the Union Prayer Book.
