= Julius Friedenwald =

American gastroenterologist and writer

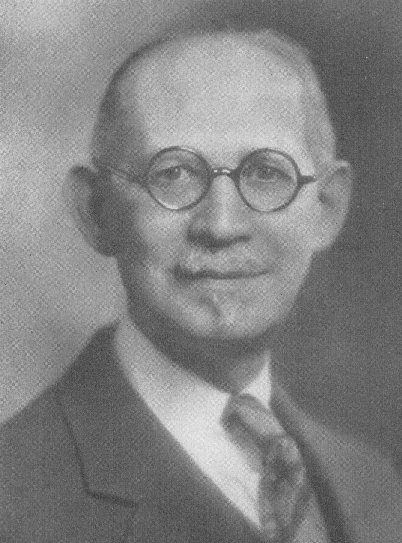
- Born: December 20, 1866; Baltimore
- Died: June 8, 1941 (aged 74); Baltimore
- Occupations: Gastroenterologist, writer

Julius Friedenwald (December 20, 1866 - June 8, 1941) was an American gastroenterologist and writer.

Friedenwald was born in Baltimore. His father Aaron Friedenwald was professor of otology and ophthalmology at the College of Physicians and Surgeons (Baltimore). He was educated at Johns Hopkins University and obtained his B.A. in 1887. He graduated M.D. from the College of Physicians and Surgeons (Baltimore) in 1890. He practiced medicine in Baltimore for over fifty years. He was President of the American Gastroenterological Association. From 1909 to 1935 Friedenwald was professor of gastroenterology at the University of Maryland. He was visiting physician to Mercy Hospital.

Friedenwald married Esther Lee in 1900. He was a fellow of the American Medical Association, member of the American College of Physicians and associate member of the American Association of Physicians. The Julius Friedenwald Medal was established in 1941 to recognize individuals who made lifelong contributions to the field of gastroenterology.

== Selected publications ==
- Diet in Health and Disease (1913)
- Dietetics for Nurses (1920)
