= Moses Cohen Mordecai =

American politician

- Born: February 19, 1804; Charleston, South Carolina, U.S.
- Died: December 30, 1888 (aged 84); Baltimore, Maryland, U.S.
- Occupation: Businessman
- Spouse: Isabel Rebecca Lyons
- Children: 4

Moses Cohen Mordecai (1804–1888) was an American businessman, politician, and parnas (synagogue administrator). He was the owner of the Mordecai Steamship Line, which he used to import fruit, sugar, tobacco, and coffee. He also served as a member of the South Carolina Senate. He became "the most prominent Jewish Charlestonian of the 1850s and 1860s." During the American Civil War, he supported the Confederate States of America, and his ships were used by the Confederate States Navy. He retired in Baltimore.

== Early life ==
Moses Cohen Mordecai was born on February 19, 1804, in Charleston, South Carolina.

== Career ==
Mordecai owned the Mordecai Steamship Line, which he used to import fruit, sugar, tobacco, and coffee. Additionally, he was a co-owner of the Southern Standard, a newspaper published in South Carolina from 1851 to 1858. At the same time, he served as a member of the South Carolina Senate. His votes reflected his opposition to secession in the 1850s, prior to the American Civil War of 1861–1865. He used his newspaper to echo this position. Moreover, he was widely seen as a politician representing the merchant class and free trade.

According to author Robert N. Rosen, Mordecai became "the most prominent Jewish Charlestonian of the 1850s and 1860s." He served as the parnass, or chief administrative officer, of the Congregation Kahal Kadosh Beth Elohim, a synagogue in Charleston. Overall, he did not suffer from much open antisemitism; however, historians have noted that Senator James Henry Hammond (1807–1864) privately called him a "miserable Jew" in his diary.

During the American Civil War of 1861–1865, Mordecai decided to change his mind about secession and supported the Confederate States of America. Some of his ships were used by the Confederate States Navy. For example, the Isabel, named in honor of his wife, was used to remove Major Robert Anderson (1805–1871) from Fort Sumter at the Battle of Fort Sumter on April 14, 1861. In the aftermath of the Civil War, and after his shipping enterprise had been shattered and he became blind, he moved to Baltimore, Maryland.

Mordecai was a slave owner.

== Personal life ==
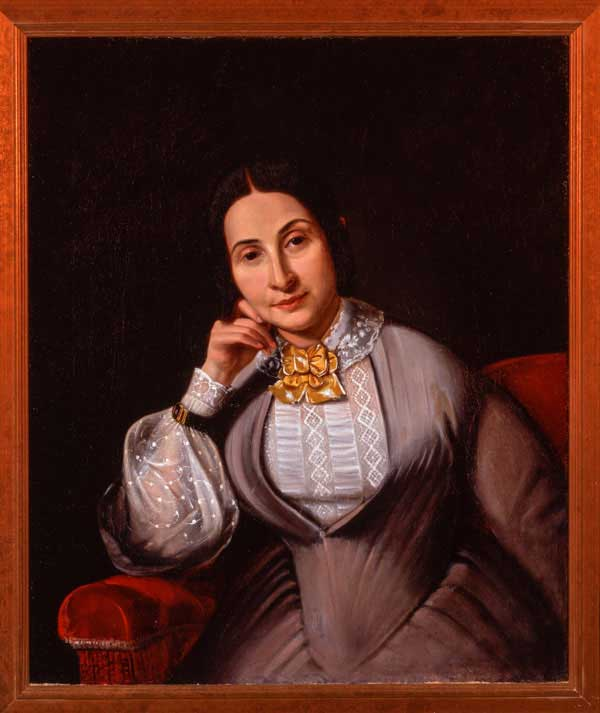
Isabel Rebecca Lyons Mordecai, portrait by Theodore Sidney Moïse

Mordecai married Isabel Rebecca Lyons (1804–1896). They had four children:

- Hortensia Mordecai (1830–1899)
- Rosa Hays Mordecai Tobias (1832–1897)
- Minnie Mordecai Lazarus (1839–1913)
- Isabel Mordecai (1842–1927)

In 1837, he purchased a mansion in Charleston built for Dr Jean Ernest Poyas (1756–1824) in the Adam style; it became his family home. The house is located at 69 Meeting Street near St. Michael's Episcopal Church, south of Broad Street, in Charleston, South Carolina. Despite the Civil War, the house still stands today.

== Death ==
Mordecai died on December 30, 1888, in Baltimore.
