= Rosenstock =

Rosenstock is a surname of German origin (Rosenstock meaning rosebush in German). Notable people with the surname include:

- Eugen Rosenstock-Huessy (1888–1973), German social philosopher
- Fred Rosenstock (1895–1986), Austrian-born American book and art collector
- Gabriel Rosenstock (1949–2026), Irish poet, essayist, and translator
- Jeff Rosenstock (born 1982), American musician
- Józef Rosenstock (1895–1985), Polish conductor
- Larry Rosenstock, American civil servant and schoolteacher
- Linda Rosenstock (born 1950), Public health administrator
- Mario Rosenstock (born 1971), Irish actor and musician
- Milton Rosenstock (1917–1992), American conductor and composer
- Odette Abadi (née Rosenstock; 1914–1999) French physician, and member of the Resistance
- Tristan Tzara (1896-1963), French-Romanian poet and essayist whose real name was Samuel Rosenstock

== See also ==
- Rosenstock Village Site, a historic site located in Frederick County, Maryland
