= David Philipson =

American Reform rabbi (1862–1949)

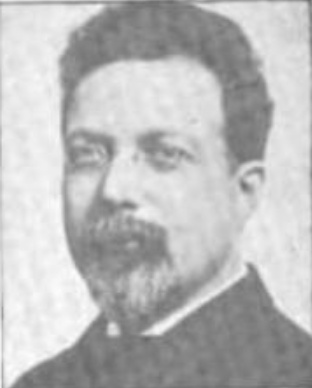
- Born: August 9, 1862; Wabash, Indiana, U.S.
- Died: June 29, 1949 (aged 86); Boston, Massachusetts, U.S.
- Resting place: United Jewish Cemetery
- Education: Hebrew Union College; University of Cincinnati
- Occupations: Rabbi, writer

David Philipson (August 9, 1862 – June 29, 1949) was an American Reform rabbi, orator, and author.

The son of German-Jewish immigrants, he was a member of the first graduating class of the Hebrew Union College in Cincinnati. As an adult, he was one of the leaders of American Reform Judaism and a philanthropic leader in his adopted hometown of Cincinnati. In addition to English, he spoke Hebrew, German, Arabic, Aramaic, and Amharic.

== Early life ==
Philipson was born in Wabash, Indiana to Reform Jewish parents from Germany. His family shortly moved to Columbus, Ohio. He went to grammar school there and was confirmed. At the invitation of Rabbi Isaac M. Wise, who was friends with David's father (Joseph Philipson), David moved to Cincinnati to become a member of the first class of Hebrew Union College (HUC), a Reform Jewish Seminary Rev. Wise was beginning.

Philipson lodged with a prominent Jewish family during his time taking classes both at HUC and Hughes High School. He graduated from both Hughes High School and the preparatory section of HUC in 1879, and was valedictorian at the former. He immediately matriculated into college courses at HUC while also studying at the University of Cincinnati.

He graduated from The University of Cincinnati in 1883 with a Bachelor of Arts in Classics. He was also one of four men ordained as Reform Rabbis in that year, and was one of those feted at the Trefa Banquet that HUC hosted for its first ordination class.

== Beginnings in Ministry (1883–1888) ==
Philipson did not intend to go directly into the ministry, but instead chose to spend time in Dallas to aid in the growth of Reform Judaism there. However, he was offered the opportunity to minister at Har Sinai Congregation, a prestigious congregation in Baltimore. He initially refused the offer, but later agreed to go. He also continued his education at Johns Hopkins University. There, he was classmates with Cyrus Adler, and he continued his language acquisition, learning Aramaic and Amharic. He received a Doctorate of Divinity from Johns Hopkins in 1886 where he studied Assyriology and other Semitic languages. Also in that year, he married Ella Hollander, a young woman who attended his Bible studies.

Philipson gained attention within Baltimore society by serving on the board of the Baltimore Charity Organization Society, on which he was the only Jew. Additionally, he gave a eulogy for Henry Ward Beecher to his congregation as a sermon, an action considered noteworthy at the time because it was a speech on a non-Jew for a Jewish audience. Within Jewish circles, Philipson drew acclaim for acting as secretary at the famous Pittsburgh Platform meetings in 1885. These meetings established "Classical Reform Judaism" and rejected Jewish laws that had a ritual, rather than moral basis. His work in Pittsburgh, as well as his background at HUC launched him into acclaim among Reform Jews.

== Life in Cincinnati (1888–1949) ==
Philipson returned to Cincinnati in 1888, bringing his Baltimore-raised wife, Ella Hollander, with him. He took over ministry at Bene Israel from Rabbi Max Lilienthal, and also taught at the Bene Israel religious school and at HUC. He not only opened symposiums on controversies in Jewish life, such as intermarriage and the idea of a "Jewish Race". Philipson was also active in politics, not only opposing antisemitism but also the rampant corruption in Cincinnati politics.

=== Inter-religious and secular work in Cincinnati ===
Philipson was the first Jewish leader in Cincinnati to actively participate in public society. He worked mostly with other religious figures, but also participated in many secular charity efforts. He was the first Jew to speak at an Episcopalian chancel, at the invitation of a Cincinnatian priest. He also spoke out against American imperialism, and in 1902 he allied with Hon. Rufus Smith and future president William Howard Taft in person and in print, filling the editorial pages of The Cincinnati Enquirer with anti-imperialist columns. His politically oriented sermons were famous and often controversial; they often found him at odds with other rabbis and important congregational figures.

During World War I, Philipson worked to ensure local politicians that the Jewish community were not sympathizers to the German cause. In 1921, his friend Rufus Smith chose him to arbitrate a strike by the Cincinnati Builders Union.

In 1927, the Queen of Romania went on a tour of the United States. She stopped in Cincinnati and offered all of the local religious and political heads an invitation to dine with her. Philipson attained national attention when he refused her invitation due to the pogroms that were going on throughout Romania at that time. In his later years, Philipson largely retired from public life. However, he aided in organizing an anti-Nazi protest march (1933) and wrote in 1940 that the United States should join the war against Nazi Germany.

=== Work within the Jewish community ===
As rabbi at the largest Reform congregation in the center of Reform Jewish life, Philipson had tremendous influence both within Cincinnati and in the whole country. He was very active in the Central Conference of American Rabbis and United American Hebrew Council throughout his life.

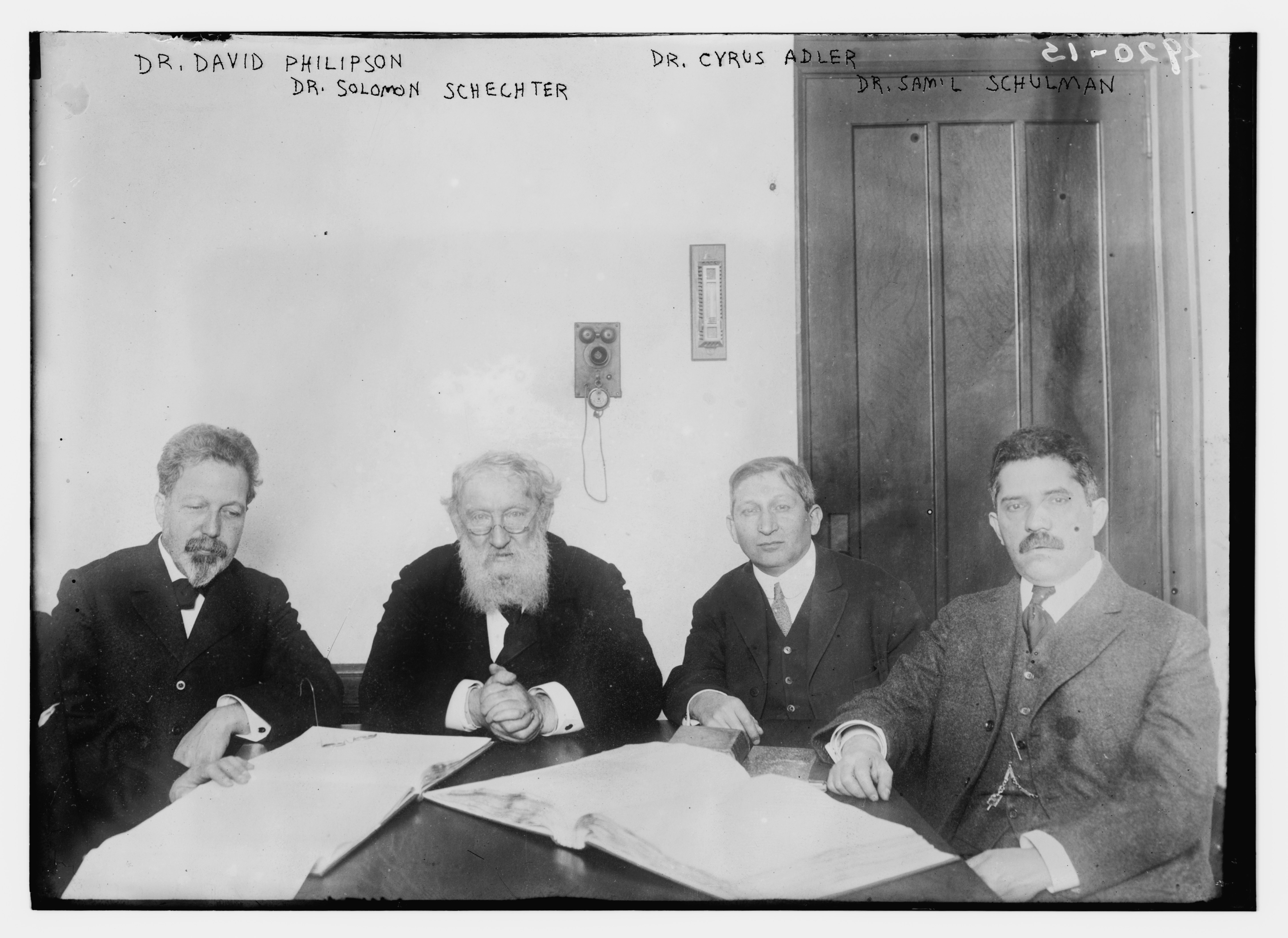
Dr. David Philipson (left) with Drs. Solomon Schechter, Cyrus Adler and Samuel Schulman c. 1913

In the early 20th century, Philipson was most famous for his anti-Zionist beliefs. Believing that "...no man can be a member of two Nationalities", Philipson used his power to counter what he saw as the exclusionary and zealous acts of Zionists. He used HUC's journal of Reform Judaism, The American Israelite, to further his view that Judaism was a religion exclusively, and thus stateless. Shortly after the First Zionist Congress in Basel, the Union of American Hebrew Congregations held its first convention. With Philipson at their head, they issued a statement in 1897 stating that "America is our Zion".

Rev. Philipson became a prominent religious figure in Cincinnati, even consecrating Orthodox synagogues, such as Ohave Shalom in 1905. He traveled throughout the United States speaking at graduations, consecrations, funerals, and other events, with his oratory contributing to Cincinnati's tradition of Reform Jewish intellectualism.

== Last years/death ==
Philipson retired from his position as Rabbi of Bene Israel in 1938. He did very little in public life after his retirement, but stayed active in various Jewish organizations and charities. He died at Beth Israel Hospital in Boston after collapsing at a convention of the Central Conference of American Rabbis in Bretton Woods, New Hampshire in 1949. He is buried at the United Jewish Cemetery in Cincinnati.

== Published works ==
Philipson wrote extensively in his adult life. He co-wrote the Union Prayer Book, the central prayer book for Reform Judaism, and presided over the first few of its re-publishings.

His first published work was The Jew in English Fiction. While in England giving talks about this book, he was given the correspondence of Rebecca Gratz, who is widely believed to be the model for Sir Walter Scott's Rebecca in his masterpiece Ivanhoe. He also is noted for writing Old European Jewries, considered to be a foundational work on the study of ghetto life. His memoir, written in 1940, is My Life as an American Jew. He was a member of the translation committee for the Jewish Publication Society's 1917 Bible translation into English. His most famous and notable work is titled The Reform Movement in Judaism. In it, he writes on the history and ideology of the movement both in Europe and the United States. It was widely lauded at the time of its publication, and is still seen as a master work on its subject.

=== List of works ===
- "David Philipson Papers". American Jewish Archives.
- Philipson, David (1941). My Life as an American Jew. Cincinnati: J.G. Kidd & Son. OCLC 238022.
- Philipson, David (1919). Centenary papers and others. Cincinnati: Ark Pub. Co. OCLC 315925.
- Philipson, David (1918). Are the Germans the chosen people? Address delivered at the Business Men's Club, Cincinnati, January 28th, 1918. OCLC 558492119.
- Philipson, David (1914). The principles and achievements of the Central Conference of American Rabbis : twenty-fifth anniversary address. OCLC 8853677.
- Philipson, David (1910). Syllabus of lectures on the prophets of Israel. Cincinnati. OCLC 229162456.
- Philipson, David (1909). The Jew in America. Cincinnati: Central Conference of American Rabbis. OCLC 8853372.
- Philipson, David (1907). The Reform Movement in Judaism. Macmillan.
- Philipson, David (1895). Tendencies of thought in modern Judaism. Boston: Houghton.
- Philipson, David (1894). Old European Jewries. Philadelphia: The Jewish Publication Society of America. OCLC 315925.
- Philipson, David (1889). The Jew in English Fiction. Cincinnati: Robert Clarke Comp. OCLC 506684.
- Philipson, David (1889). Sabbath legislation and personal liberty : lecture delivered before Congregation B'ne Israel. Cincinnati: Bloch Print. Co. OCLC 8853677.
