= Henry Hochheimer =

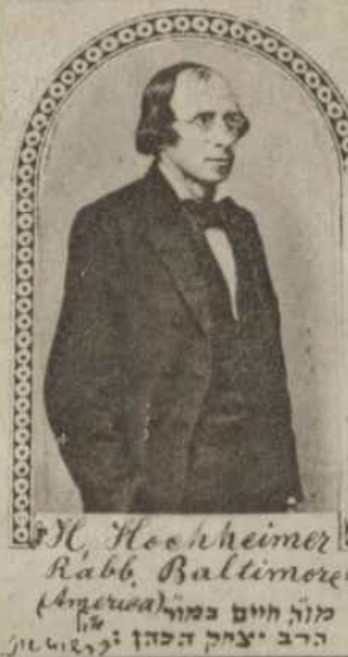
Henry Hochheimer Rabb. Baltimore

Henry Hochheimer (3 October 1818 – 25 January 1912) was a German-American rabbi who ministered in Baltimore, Maryland for over 40 years.

== Biography ==
Hochheimer was born on 3 October 1818 in Ansbach, Middle Franconia, Bavaria, the son of Rabbi Isaac Hochheimer.

When Hochheimer was 10, the family moved to Ichenhausen, where his father was made the town's rabbi. He returned to Ansbach four years later to pursue secular studies at the Lateinschule and Hebrew studies with his grandfather Moses Hochheimer. In 1835, he started studying at the gymnasium in Augsburg, and entered the Ludwig-Maximilians-Universität München four years later. He graduated from the latter in 1844. He also studied Hebrew subjects under Rabbi Guggenheimer of Kriegshaber and Rabbi Hirsch Aub of Munich, and was ordained a rabbi by the latter in 1845. He worked as his father's assistant in Ichenhausen from 1844 to 1849. Hochheimer wrote political addresses and articles in Die Zeitung für die Elegante Welt and Der Grenzbote during the German revolutions of 1848–1849, which led to warrants issued against him and forced him to flee the country to the USA in 1849.

In October 1849, shortly after arriving in New York City, Hochheimer was elected rabbi of the Baltimore Hebrew Congregation in Baltimore, Maryland. His inaugural sermon was translated and published by Isaac Leeser in The Occident and American Jewish Advocate. He served as rabbi in the Baltimore Hebrew Congregation for the next ten years. In 1859, he became rabbi of Fell's Point Hebrew Friendship Congregation and served as their rabbi until his retirement in 1892.

In 1871, Hochheimer collaborated with Benjamin Szold and Marcus Jastrow in revising the prayer book Avodat Yisrael. In 1841, he published his first article in Julius Fürst's Der Orient, and regularly contributed to the Jewish press since, especially to Die Deborah and the Allgemeine Zeitung des Judentums. Several of his sermons were included in Meyer Kayserling's Bibliothek Jüdischer Kanzelredner, and a number of his addresses were published in pamphlets. His wife's name was Rosalia. They had two surviving children, including Baltimore lawyer Lewis Hochheimer.

Hochheimer died in the Baltimore Hebrew Hospital and Asylum on January 25, 1912. He was buried in the Baltimore Hebrew Friendship Cemetery.
