= Amram Taub =

American rabbi

Amram Taub (Hebrew: עמרם טויב; c. 1917 – 2007) was the rabbi for over fifty years of Congregation Arugas Habosem, a synagogue in Baltimore, Maryland. Taub was called the "Brider rebbe", after his paternal ancestor Aharon Tzvi Taub, rebbe of the Hasidic dynasty of Brid in Hungary.

Taub was born about 1917 in Khust, Hungary (now Ukraine) He was the eldest child of Shmuel David (a grandson of the rebbe of Brid) and Yocheved Yitl née Grunwald (whose father was part of the Grunwald rabbinic family). In his teens he studied in the yeshivas of future Satmar rebbe Joel Teitelbaum, first in Kruli (Carei), then in Satmar (Satu Mare).

When he was eighteen Taub married Sarah Chanah Leah and he was appointed as the dayan (rabbinical judge) of the village of Behutz at the age of twenty, where he remained for about two years until he became, for a short while, a dayan in Solotvyno itself; this was his last position before the Holocaust.

During the Holocaust, Taub, his wife and their five children were taken to Auschwitz; he alone survived. His parents and maternal grandfather and his father-in-law were also taken to Auschwitz in 1944 and killed.

He died on July 14, 2007.
