= Union Prayer Book =

Reform Jewish prayer book

- Author: Central Conference of American Rabbis
- Language: English and Hebrew
- Subject: Prayer book
- Genre: Reform Jewish siddur
- Publisher: CCAR Press
- Publication date: 1892
- Preceded by: Olat Tamid, Minhag America
- Followed by: Gates of Prayer

The Union Prayer Book was a Siddur published by the Central Conference of American Rabbis to serve the needs of the Reform Judaism movement in the United States.

== History ==
An original version of the prayer book was published in 1892, based on the Minhag America prayer book authored in 1857 by Rabbi Isaac Mayer Wise. By the time it was released, a group within the Reform movement led by Rabbi David Einhorn of Baltimore sought to implement greater changes, and the 1892 editions were recalled at significant cost.

The 1895 release was edited by Rabbi Kaufmann Kohler, author of the Pittsburgh Platform of 1885 that established the tenets of "Classical Reform". This version eliminated aspects from the traditional concepts of Jews as a chosen people, a personal Messiah, resurrection and of a return to Israel. References to the role of the priesthood and sacrificial offerings were removed, most notably by the excision of the musaf service on Shabbat and holidays. The service in the Union Prayer Book was structured to have little participation from congregants, with most aspects of prayer delegated to the rabbi and choir. Specific instructions for when the congregation would stand and sit were included. By July 1895, the Publication Committee of the Central Conference of American Rabbis reported that the first and second volumes of the Union Prayer Book had been published and were in use by 55 of "the most prominent congregations in the United States" in 23 states, within two months of its introduction.

Associate Rabbi Judah Leon Magnes of Manhattan's Congregation Emanu-El delivered a Passover sermon in 1910 in which he advocated changes in the Reform ritual to incorporate elements of traditional Judaism, expressing his concern that younger members of the congregation were driven to seek spirituality in other religions that cannot be obtained at Temple Emanu-El. He advocated for restoration of the Bar Mitzvah ceremony and criticized the petrification of the Union Prayer Book, advocating for a return to the traditional prayer book, "which reflects the religious yearnings of countless generations of our ancestors". Rabbi Kaufmann Kohler defended the Union Prayer Book in a May 1910 sermon that responded to Rabbi Magnes' criticisms, emphasizing that "whatever was inspiring and elevating in the old prayer book has been retained in the Union Prayer Book", which reflects "the ripe fruit of half a century of toil by Reform geniuses".

The 1918 (revised) and 1940 (newly revised) editions of the Union Prayer Book were intended to accommodate "the needs of conservative congregations insofar as these do not conflict with the principles of the Conference", changing the word "Minister" in the first and second editions to "Reader" in the 1940 edition. The 1940 edition showed a greater emphasis on Jewish peoplehood, reflecting the 1937 Columbus Platform that supported the creation of a homeland for the Jewish people in Palestine.

== Consideration of a successor prayer book ==
At a meeting of American and Canadian Reform leaders held in Toronto in June 1966, an announcement was made that the CCAR's Committee on Liturgy would begin a "re-evaluation and research" process aimed at a rewrite of the Union Prayer Book

At the 78th annual meeting of the CCAR in June 1967, held at The Ambassador Hotel in Los Angeles, discussions were undertaken regarding a replacement or revision of the Union Prayer Book. Rabbi Joseph Narot, who had been working on the project, described how the Union Prayer Book had been last updated 30 years prior, "before the Nazi holocaust, before the atomic bomb and before the space age" and that it did not address "the theological and moral questions that have been raised by these momentous issues". A study of the prayer book by Rabbi Jack Bemporad included sharp criticism of several aspects of the UPB.

With rising interest in the 1960s in Zionism and The Holocaust, as well as an upsurge in Jewish pride and identity following the Six-Day War, it became clear that the Union Prayer Book was no longer adequate. The CCAR released an updated prayer book, edited by Rabbi Chaim Stern as part of a committee chaired by Rabbi A. Stanley Dreyfus. The new Gates of Prayer, the New Union Prayer Book was announced in October 1975 as a replacement for the UPB, incorporating more Hebrew content and was updated to be more accessible to modern worshipers.

In 2000, Chicago Sinai Congregation in Chicago, Illinois published yet another revised version of the Union Prayer Book, which modernized the Elizabethan English of the previous versions, while attempting to preserve the lofty, poetic prose of the original. In addition, the liturgy was updated to address and reflect upon the Holocaust and the founding of the State of Israel, neither of which had happened yet at the time of the publication of the 1940 edition. Only a handful of ultra-liberal congregations have adopted the Sinai Edition of the UPB, the rest preferring to use Gates of Prayer or Mishkan Tefillah, which reflect more closely the neo-traditionalist trends in the Reform Movement. In 2012, Chicago Sinai Congregation and the Society for Classical Reform Judaism published a revision of the 2000 Sinai UPB.
