= Lab School =

The Lab School may mean:

- laboratory school
- The Education Laboratory School in Honolulu, Hawaii
- The Baltimore Lab School in Baltimore, Maryland
- The Lab School of Bethlehem Central High School in Delmar, New York
- The Lab School of Washington in District of Columbia
- The Martin Luther King Junior Laboratory School in Evanston, Illinois
- The Model Laboratory School in Richmond, Kentucky
- The NYC Lab School in New York City
- The University of Chicago Laboratory Schools in Chicago

Differences and disabilities
