= Norcross Brothers =

19th-century American construction company based in Worcester, MA

Norcross Brothers, Contractors and Builders was a nineteenth-century American construction company, especially noted for its work, mostly in stone, for the architectural firms of H.H. Richardson and McKim, Mead & White. The company was founded in 1864 by brothers James Atkinson Norcross (1831-1903) and Orlando Whitney Norcross (1839-1920). It won its first major contract in 1869, and is credited with having completed over 650 building projects.

== History ==
The Norcross brothers, James Atkinson (b. 24 March 1831) and Orlando Whitney (b. 26 October 1839), were born in Maine to Jesse Springer Norcross, proprietor of the Norcross Mills, and his wife, Margaret Ann Whitney. The brothers moved to Worcester, Massachusetts in 1868. Their pedigree descends from Philip Norcross and his wife, Sarah [Jackson], the brothers' paternal great - great grandparents, originally of Watertown, MA.

Skilled construction carpenters, the brothers formed their own construction company in 1864, and three years later contracted to build the new Worcester high school. The architect of the school was a young, but soon to be famous, Henry Hobson Richardson, and from then on Norcross Brothers became Richardson's favorite contractor, ultimately building more than thirty of his designs, including three considered by many his best work: Trinity Church in Boston, Massachusetts; the Marshall Field's & Company building in Chicago, Illinois; and the Allegheny County Courthouse in Pittsburgh, Pennsylvania.

Following the death of Richardson, the brothers became the contractor for many of McKim, Mead & White's projects. When MM&W opened a new office in New York City, in 1894, the Norcross Brothers had their own space within it. As had been the case with Richardson, much of the value of the Norcross Brothers to MM&W, and other architects derived from Orlando Norcross's engineering skill. Though largely self-taught, he had developed the skills needed to solve the vast engineering problems brought to him by his clients. For example, the size of the dome at the Rhode Island Capitol was expanded very late in the design process, perhaps even after construction had begun, so that it would be larger than the one just completed by Cass Gilbert for the Minnesota Capitol.

Because of their need for stone, a primary building material of the time, was outpacing the supply the brothers eventually acquired their own stone quarries, first in Connecticut (Branford) (now on the National Register of Historic Places) and in Massachusetts, and later in Westchester County, New York and in Georgia. They also established a factory in Worcester where they manufactured architectural building parts.

== Selected H.H. Richardson projects ==
- Ames Monument, Laramie, Wyoming, Augustus Saint-Gaudens, sculptor, 1882
- William Watts Sherman House, Newport, RI, 1875 - 1876.

== Projects for other architects ==
- Juniper Hall, later Masonic Hospital, Shrewsbury, Massachusetts, James Earle, architect
- Art Institute of Chicago, Shepley, Rutan and Coolidge, Chicago, Illinois, 1892
- Cathedral of All Saints, Albany, New York, Robert Gibson, Architect, begun 1884
- Congregational Library & Archives, Shepley, Rutan, and Coolidge, Boston, Massachusetts, 1889
- The Algonquin Club, Boston, McKim, Mead and White, architects, 1886
- Adams Memorial, McKim, Mead and White, architects, Augustus Saint-Gaudens, sculptor, Rock Creek Cemetery, Washington D.C., 1891
- Millicent Library, Brigham & Spofford architects, Fairhaven, Massachusetts, 1893, as well as numerous other public libraries, mostly in the north eastern part of the United States.
- Crouse Memorial College, Syracuse, New York, Archimedes Russell, architect, 1897
- South Station, Boston, Massachusetts with Shepley, Rutan and Coolidge, 1897
- Worcester City Hall, Worcester, Massachusetts, Peabody and Stearns, architects, 1895–1898
- University Club of New York, McKim, Mead and White, architects, 1899
- Symphony Hall, Boston, Massachusetts, McKim, Mead and White, architects, 1900
- Jersey City Public Library, Jersey City, New Jersey, Brite & Bacon, architects, 1901
- Low Library, Columbia University, New York City, McKim, Mead and White, architects,
- Norcross Mausoleum, Hope Cemetery, Worcester, Massachusetts, 1903
- Corcoran Art Gallery, Washington D.C.
- Leicester Congregational Church
- Leicester Public Library, Stephen Earle, architect, 1895-1896
- Harvard Medical Building, Shepley, Rutan and Coolidge, Architects, 1906
- Rhode Island State Capitol Building, McKim, Mead and White, architects, 1895–1904
- Pan American Union Building, Washington D.C. 1908-1910.
- New York Public Library Main Branch, Carrere and Hastings, architects, 1911
- Gates for Hope Cemetery, Worcester, Massachusetts, 1915
- John Dustin Archbold Mausoleum, Sleepy Hollow Cemetery, New York, 1916
- Gatehouses and Pavilion, Vanderbilt Mansion, McKim, Mead and White, architects, Hyde Park, New York, 1896–1898
- Equitable Building, Charles L. Carson and Joseph Evans Sperry, architects, Baltimore, Maryland, 1883
