= Charles L. Carson =

American architect (1847–1891)

Charles L. Carson (November 3, 1847 – December 18, 1891) was an American architect from Baltimore.

== Life and career ==
He was born in Baltimore, the oldest son of Daniel Carson, a builder. He had little formal training as an architect but learned general construction while working for his father. Circa 1870 Carson partnered with architect Thomas Dixon while taking drawing lessons at the Maryland Institute College of Art. Carson and Dixon worked from their offices at 117 Baltimore Street as Thomas Dixon and Charles L. Carson until sometime before 1877 when the partnership was dissolved. In 1888 Carson hired Joseph Evans Sperry, who became his chief assistant and later his partner and successor. Several of his buildings were completed by Sperry after Carson's death. Carson was one of the founders of the Baltimore chapter of the American Institute of Architects (AIA).

On December 6, 1870, he married Annie F. Cornelius, daughter of Richard Cornelius. He lived at 1725 Madison Avenue in Baltimore at the time of his death in 1891, at age 44. He and his wife were interred at Loudon Park Cemetery in Baltimore.

A number of his works are listed on the U.S. National Register of Historic Places.

== Selected works ==
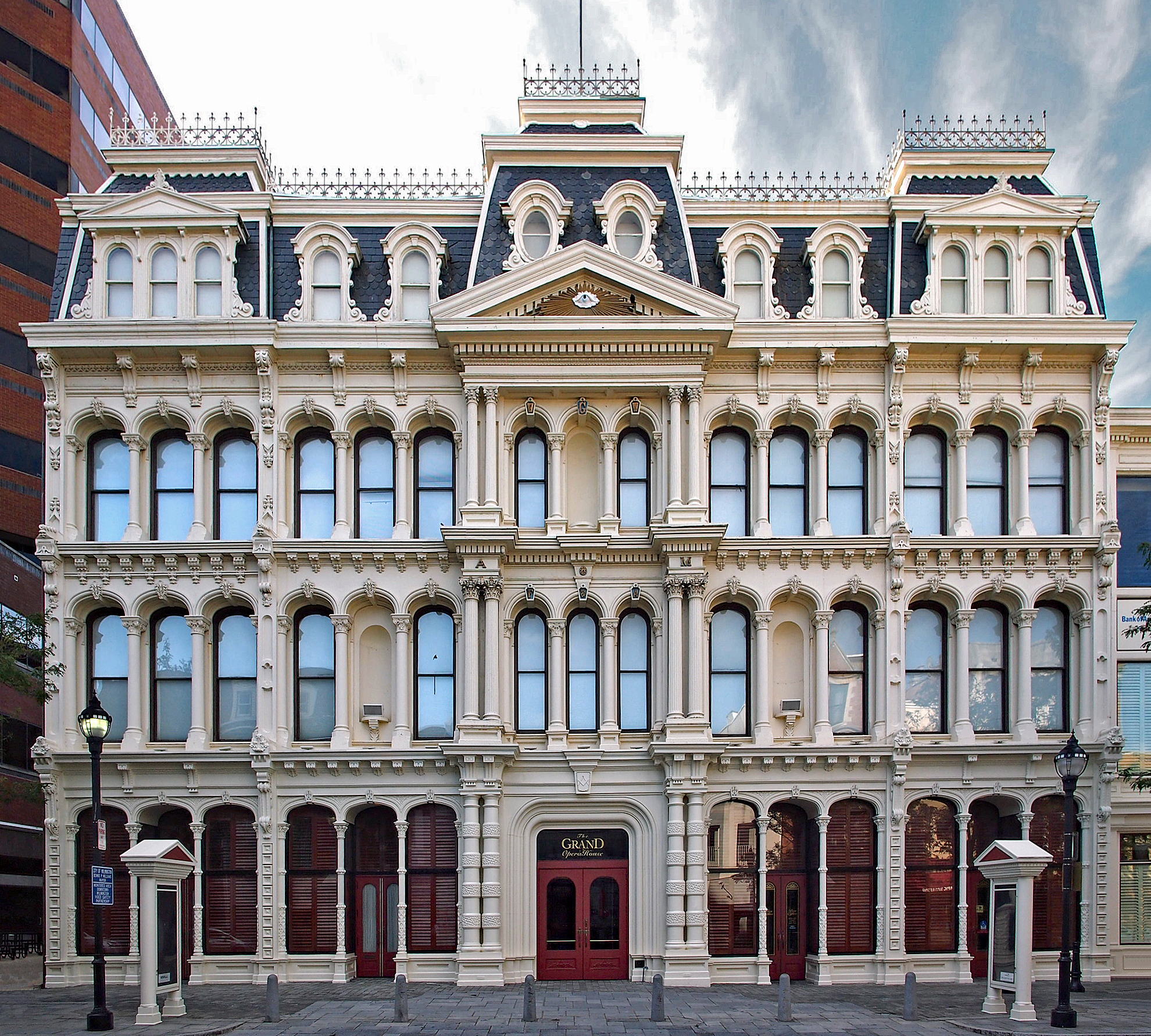
Wilmington Opera House (1871)

- Wilmington Opera House, 818 N. Market St., Wilmington, Delaware NRHP-listed
- Mount Vernon Place United Methodist Church (church only) (1872)
- Enoch Pratt Free Library, Canton Branch, Baltimore (1886)
- Eutaw Savings Bank, later the Baltimore Grand, corner of Fayette and Calvert Streets, Baltimore (1887)
- Marburg Brothers Tobacco Warehouse, S. Charles St., Baltimore (demolished about 1990)

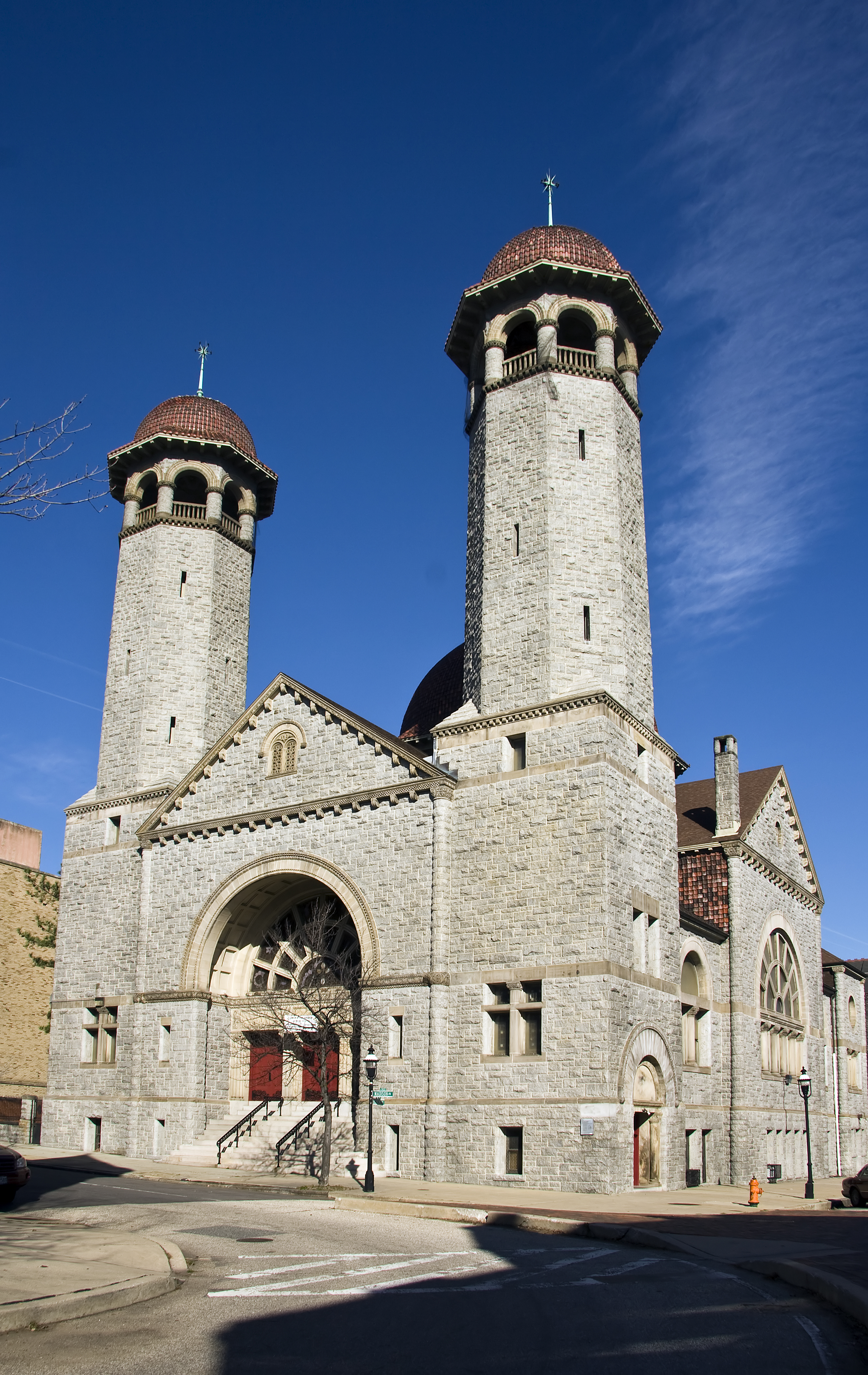
Baltimore Hebrew Congregation Synagogue

- The Strawbridge Methodist Episcopal Church, corner of Park Avenue and Wilson Street (1889)
- Baltimore Hebrew Congregation Synagogue, Baltimore (1890)
- Central Savings Bank, 1 E. Lexington St., Baltimore (1890)
- Strouse Brothers Company Building (Marlboro Square), 410 W. Lombard St, Baltimore (1890)
- Baltimore Masonic Temple, 223-225 N. Charles St., Baltimore (1893)
- Equitable Building, 10 N. Calvert St., Baltimore (1894)
- The Phoenix Club House, on Eutaw Place, Baltimore
- The Masonic Temple at 223-225 North Charles Street, Baltimore, MD.
- University of Tennessee Buildings, Knoxville, TN.
- Winchester Hotel, Winchester, VA.
- Church of the Epiphany, Washington, DC.
- Grace Methodist Episcopal Church, Wilmington, DE.
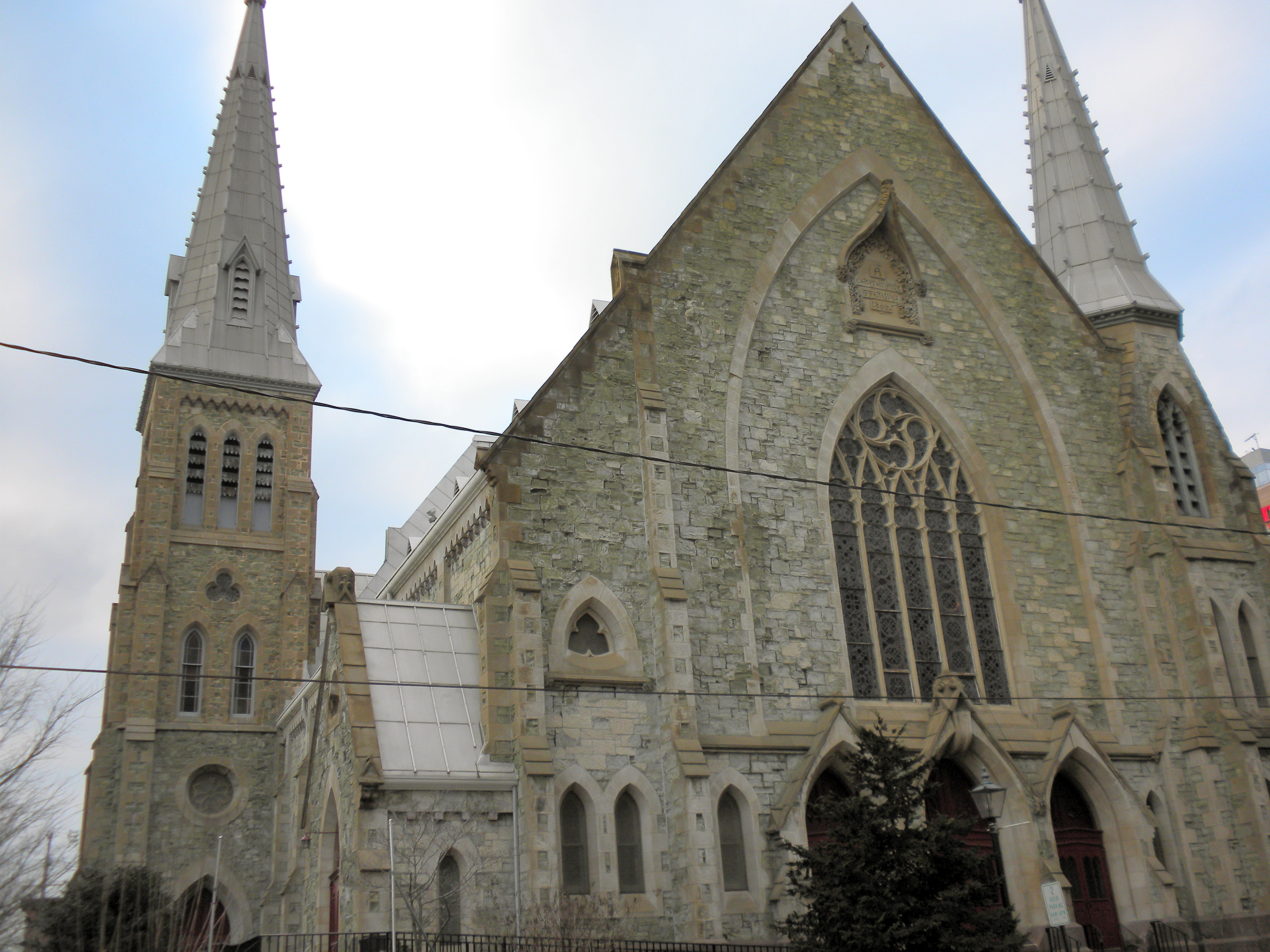
  Grace Methodist Episcopal Church, in Wilmington, Delaware
- Central Presbyterian Church, Eutaw Place, Baltimore
- Lafayette Presbyterian Church, Lafayette Square, Baltimore
- Epworth Church, corner of Gilmore and Mosher streets, Baltimore
- Baltimore Grand, 401 W. Fayette St., Baltimore, Maryland (Carson, Charles L.), NRHP-listed
- Church of the Ascension, 1215 Massachusetts Ave. NW, Washington, D.C. (Carson, Charles), NRHP-listed
- Dorchester County Courthouse and Jail, 206 High St., Cambridge, Maryland (Carson, Charles L.), NRHP-listed
- James E. Hooper House, 100 E. 23rd St., Baltimore, Maryland (Carson, Charles L.), NRHP-listed
- One or more works in Cambridge Historic District, Wards I and III, roughly bounded by Glasgow, Glenburn, Poplar, Race, and Gay Sts. and the Choptank River, Cambridge, Maryland (Carson, Charles L.), NRHP-listed
- One or more works in Goucher College Historic District, Old (Boundary Increase), roughly bounded by W. 25th St., Guilford Ave., North Ave. and Howard St., Baltimore, Maryland (Carson, Charles), NRHP-listed

Carson was supervising architect for Stanford White's Lovely Lane Methodist Church (1884) and Goucher Hall (1888).
