= Church of the Ascension and Saint Agnes =

Historic church in Washington, D.C., United States

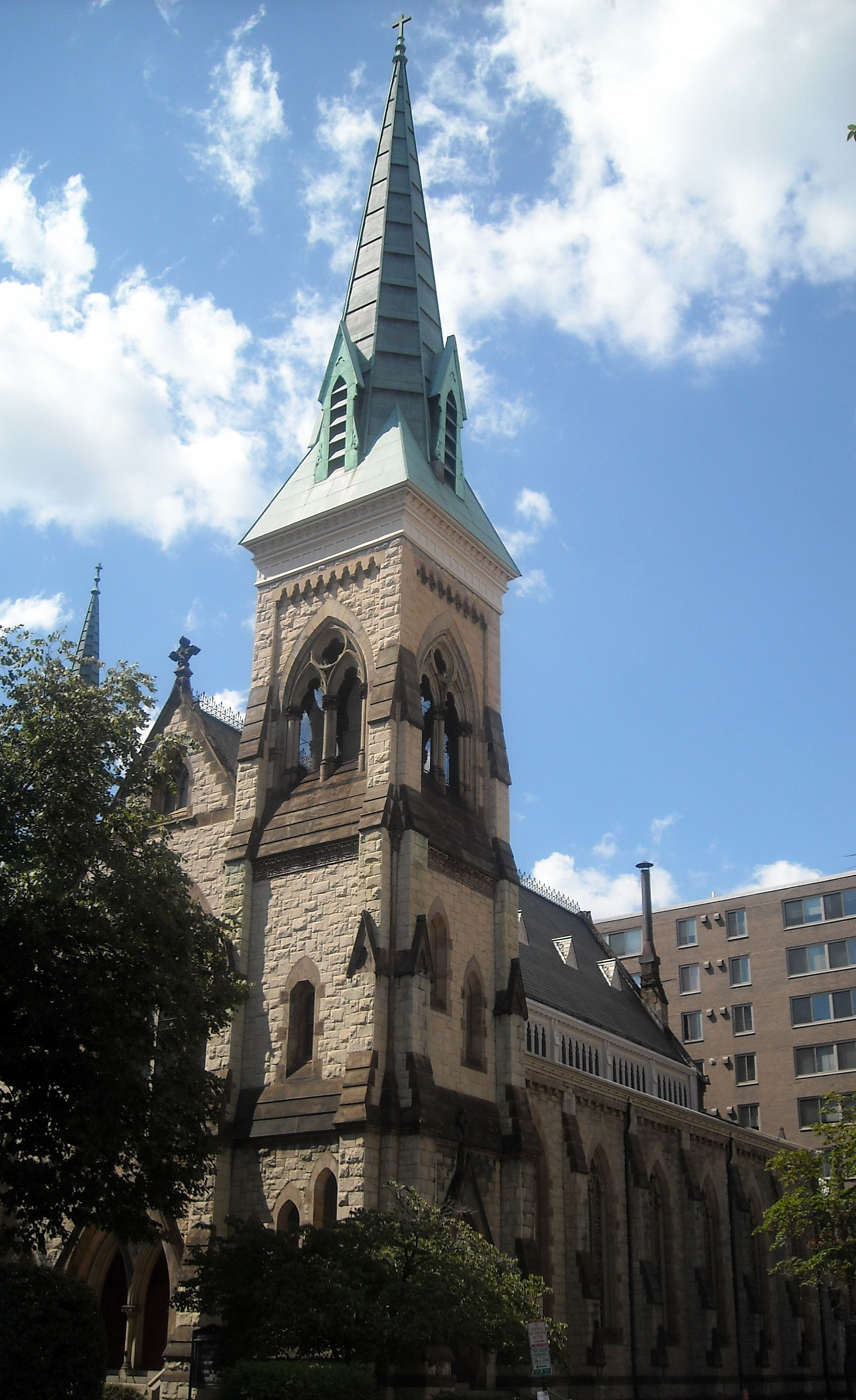
- Church of the Ascension and Saint Agnes
- Location: 1215 Massachusetts Avenue NW, Washington, D.C.
- Country: United States
- Denomination: Episcopal Church
- Website: asa-dc.org

Architecture
- Functional status: active
- Architect(s): Charles L. Carson, Thomas Dixon
- Style: Gothic
- Completed: 1874

Clergy
- Rector: The Rev. Dominique Peridans

- Church of the Ascension
- U.S. National Register of Historic Places
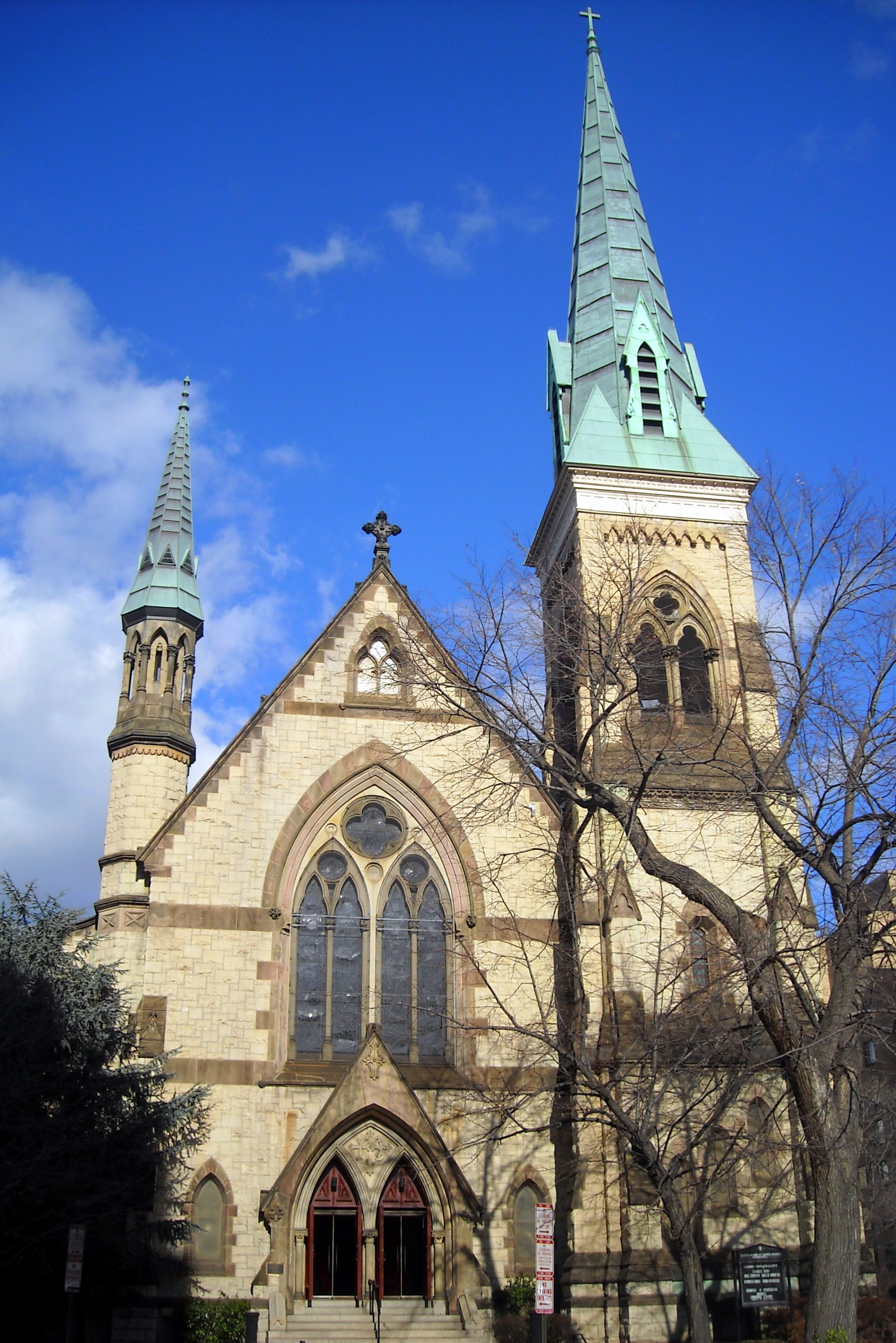

- Location within Central Washington, D.C. Location within the District of Columbia Location within the United States
- Location: 1215 Massachusetts Ave. NW, Washington, District of Columbia
- Coordinates: 38°54′18″N 77°1′43″W
- Area: 0.3 acres (0.12 ha)
- Built: 1874
- Architect: Thomas Dixon; Charles L. Carson
- Architectural style: Gothic
- NRHP reference No.: 84000863
- Added to NRHP: January 19, 1984

The Church of the Ascension and Saint Agnes is an Episcopal church building located at 1215 Massachusetts Avenue in Northwest Washington, D.C., US. The current structure built in 1874 as the Church of the Ascension was added to the National Register of Historic Places in 1984. In the late 1940s, the Church of the Ascension merged with the nearby St. Agnes Episcopal Church and adopted its present name, under which it has continued as an active parish in the Episcopal Diocese of Washington.

The church reported 127 members in 2018 and 203 members in 2023; no membership statistics were reported in 2024 parochial reports. Plate and pledge income reported for the congregation in 2024 was $973,291 with average Sunday attendance (ASA) of 97 persons. This was a relative decrease on ASA of 109 reported in 2019.

== History ==
On May 7, 1844, several residents of northwest Washington who had previously attended services at St. John's Episcopal Church in the Lafayette Square neighborhood met to begin forming their own parish. The church was formally established March 1, 1845, and the territory of St. John's was split between the two churches. While the church raised funds to construct a building, the members met in a schoolhouse on 9th Street.

Parishioner Martha Burnes was the owner of 600 acres of Washington real estate, which she had inherited. In 1802, she married John Peter Van Ness, who was a prominent banker and later became Mayor of Washington. Among Mrs. Van Ness's philanthropic endeavors was the Washington Orphan Asylum, which she established and supervised. Mrs. Van Ness expressed a desire to help the building effort, but died before this could happen. In accordance with her wishes, Mr. Van Ness donated land on H Street NW between 9th and 10th to Ascension Parish, and the cornerstone was laid September 5, 1844.

The Gothic Revival brick structure was complete enough to use by December 1844, and the first services were held December 14. The debt the parish incurred for construction was repaid by 1853, and the church was consecrated May 23 of that year. Throughout the 1850s, however, the parish continued to experience difficulties, which included the ill health of its rector, Levin I. Gilliss, resignation of his successor, a decline in the number of communicants and Sunday school attendees, and continued financial problems.

The congregation sought the Rev. William Pinkney, who was then rector of St. Matthias Church in nearby Bladensburg, Maryland, to become the next rector. After initial reluctance, Pinkney agreed and the parish stabilized. In 1859, he oversaw building renovations that included expanding the capacity for approximately 600 additional worshipers.

As many parishioners had friends and relatives in both the Northern and Southern states, their feelings and loyalties boiled over in the church during the period leading to and during the Civil War. This division was evident in the clerical ranks also as the rector, Mr Pinkney, sympathized with the South while Maryland Bishop William Whittingham was a Unionist. In March 1862, Bishop Whittingham requested parishes to say a "special prayer of thanksgiving for the late (Union) victories"; Mr. Pinkney refused.

The Saturday following Pinkney's refusal, Washington's provost marshal notified him that the authorities would assume control of the church to "prevent a disturbance." Ascension became a military hospital to house casualties from the Peninsula Campaign, as did Church of the Epiphany and Holy Trinity Catholic Church in Washington.

After the church was seized by the government, the parish was without a home. The problem was solved by member William Corcoran, a prominent banker and partner in the firm of Corcoran and Riggs, later known as Riggs Bank. Corcoran offered the use of a building he owned on H Street NW between 13th and 14th Streets.

The congregation returned to its permanent home after the war, but by 1870, the structure proved too small and not grand enough for what was now one of the most affluent areas of the city. After much debate, leaders decided to erect a new structure and began soliciting funds. William Corcoran donated a site at the northwest corner of Massachusetts Avenue and 12th Street and $100,000 of the $205,000 construction costs.

The congregation engaged the Baltimore firm of Dixon and Carson, and the cornerstone was laid June 9, 1874. The new building was constructed of white marble quarried near Cockeysville, Maryland with accents of pink Ohio sandstone. Designed in the Victorian Gothic style, it reached a height of 74 ft (23 m) with a 190 ft (58 m) tower and spire that was visible across much of the city. The interior featured cast iron columns and timber trusses and was illuminated by gas lamps.

Despite the gift of William Corcoran, the church continued to have financial problems and by 1877 was facing the possibility of dissolution. After a plea to its members, the church was able to raise needed funds and received a challenge gift of $10,000 from Corcoran. The construction debt was finally retired in 1885.

In 1895, the Diocese of Washington was created from the Diocese of Maryland and included the District of Columbia and Charles, Montgomery, Prince George's, and St. Mary's Counties in Maryland. St. Mark's Church was chosen as the cathedral in 1896. In 1902, Annunciation assumed that role until 1908, when the parish leaders voted to terminate the relationship with the diocese. Although the official designation ceased, the church continued to be used as the pro-cathedral for important occasions until 1912 while the Washington National Cathedral was under construction. In 1919, a new chapel (now known as the St. Francis Chapel) was built.

After World War I, membership began to decline, and in 1925 the congregation merged with nearby St. Stephen's to help stabilize the group. This worked briefly until the onset of the Great Depression. This downturn continued through 1947, and the Diocese considered selling the building to another congregation when the Vestry received a proposal to merge, from St. Agnes Church, located at 46 Q Street NW. Canon Albert J. duBois was rector twice, serving from 1938 to 1941 and 1946 to 1950, with significant interruptions for military service.

The interior was redecorated and in April and May 1956 a mural was added above the chancel. The painter was Jan Henryk de Rosen. The mural features Jesus of Nazareth at his Ascension, below him stands a line of seven saints: St. Thomas of Canterbury, St. Agnes, St. Athanasius, the Blessed Virgin Mary, St. Alban, St. Margaret of Scotland and St. Vincent. The nave windows and window above the organ gallery were replaced between 1965 and 1975 with faceted glass and epoxy designs created by the Willet Studios of Philadelphia, Pennsylvania.

Today, the church offers worship services, concerts, and a number of outreach groups for members and nearby residents.

== Parish ==
The current parish is a diverse, urban congregation from both the downtown area and the Washington, D.C., metropolitan area. Some parishioners come from Baltimore, Annapolis, and Richmond. It has a 20s and 30s group, including students from nearby Virginia Theological Seminary, who also attend services there.

=== Worship ===
The main Sunday service is Solemn Mass with choir and organ, at 10:30 am. Another Sunday mass with cantor and organ is at 8:00 a.m. During the week, eucharistic adoration and Low Mass are offered on Wednesday evenings. Evensong (with Angelus) is sung on certain Feast Days.

=== Ministries ===
The ministries of the parish include the following:

- Community groups: Ascension and St. Agnes has two weekly community groups where individuals from the parish and outside come together for a meal and conversation.
- Alpha Course: A ten-week course introducing the basics of Christianity. Designed for both non-believers and those who would simply like to refresh their faith, it has been taken by some 11 million people worldwide.
- Catechumenate: A course of preparation used by the church since the 4th century to prepare new Christians for baptism. The course runs from October through April and serves as instruction for those wishing to be baptized, confirmed or received into the Episcopal Church.
- Theology Book Club: A monthly group which studies and discusses various theological works.
- Benedictine cell: Serves as a group to engage those wishing to explore monastic spirituality.
- Bible Study: Bible study is held Sunday mornings at 9:00 a.m.
- Outreach programs: The parish helps subsidize Christ House, a hospital for the inner city poor and homeless. Christ House is a United Way charity. The parish also participates in the mission of N Street Village, which offers programs for homeless women and low-income families. In addition, Ascension and St. Agnes runs an annual mission trip to San Juan de Oriente, Nicaragua.

== Organs ==
Soon after the construction of the current building in 1875, the Roosevelt firm installed a mechanical action organ in what is now the Lady Chapel, the side altar on the Gospel side of the sanctuary. By the 1960s the Roosevelt instrument required substantial restoration. Unfortunately, funds for the organ were scarce. Therefore, the parish organist, Robert C. Shone, undertook the assembly of an instrument himself. The rear balcony became the new location for the three manual instrument, which had been constructed from spare pipework from the discarded Roosevelt and surplus mechanical parts. The reconstructed instrument, however, grew unreliable; and in 1983 the M. P. Moller firm of Hagerstown, Maryland, was commissioned to build a new instrument for the church. Moller retained only two ranks of pipes from the original Roosevelt (the Swell Gedeckt 8' and the same division's Spitz Flute 2’) and supplied entirely new structure, winding, console, and pipework for its opus 11615. In a short decade and a half the Moller instrument had suffered significant structural and tonal failures, largely the result of poor metal in the largest pipes and structural defects. In addition, it became mechanically unreliable; and since the Moller firm had ceased to exist in 1989, the parish had no recourse other than to commission a repair and rebuilding of the instrument. The parish organ committee selected the firm of Orgues Létourneau of Sainte-Hyacinthe, Québec and engaged a design consultant, Charles Nazarian of Gloucester, Massachusetts. Thanks to the close collaboration between Mr. Nazarian and the designers on the staff of Orgues Létourneau, the plan for the Church of the Ascension and Saint Agnes evolved into the twin cases of American red oak framing the central window.

The Létourneau firm removed the Moller organ in early May 2000. The new instrument of 55 stops and 55 ranks was blessed and put into service immediately before Christmas Midnight Mass of 2000. The Létourneau firm retained some of the better M.P. Möller pipework, mainly the shorter flue pipes made of spotted metal. It also carefully kept the two stops from the original Roosevelt that had been, in turn, kept by Möller. The pedal division's Open Wood Diapason came from the 1919 organ at Calvary Episcopal Church in Northeast Washington, a rank that was no longer needed when that parish recently rebuilt its organ.

== Gallery ==
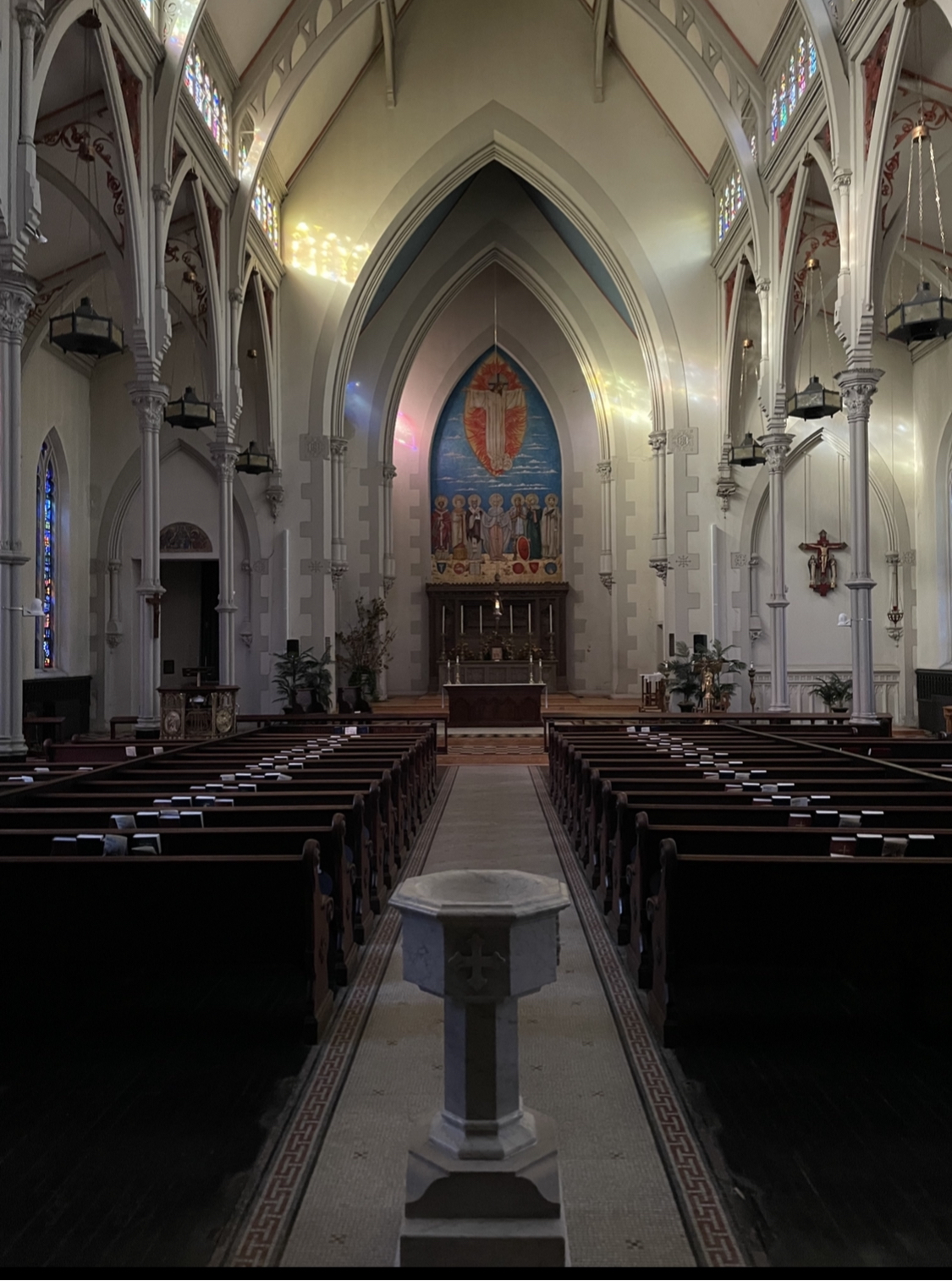
View from Nave towards the Chancel

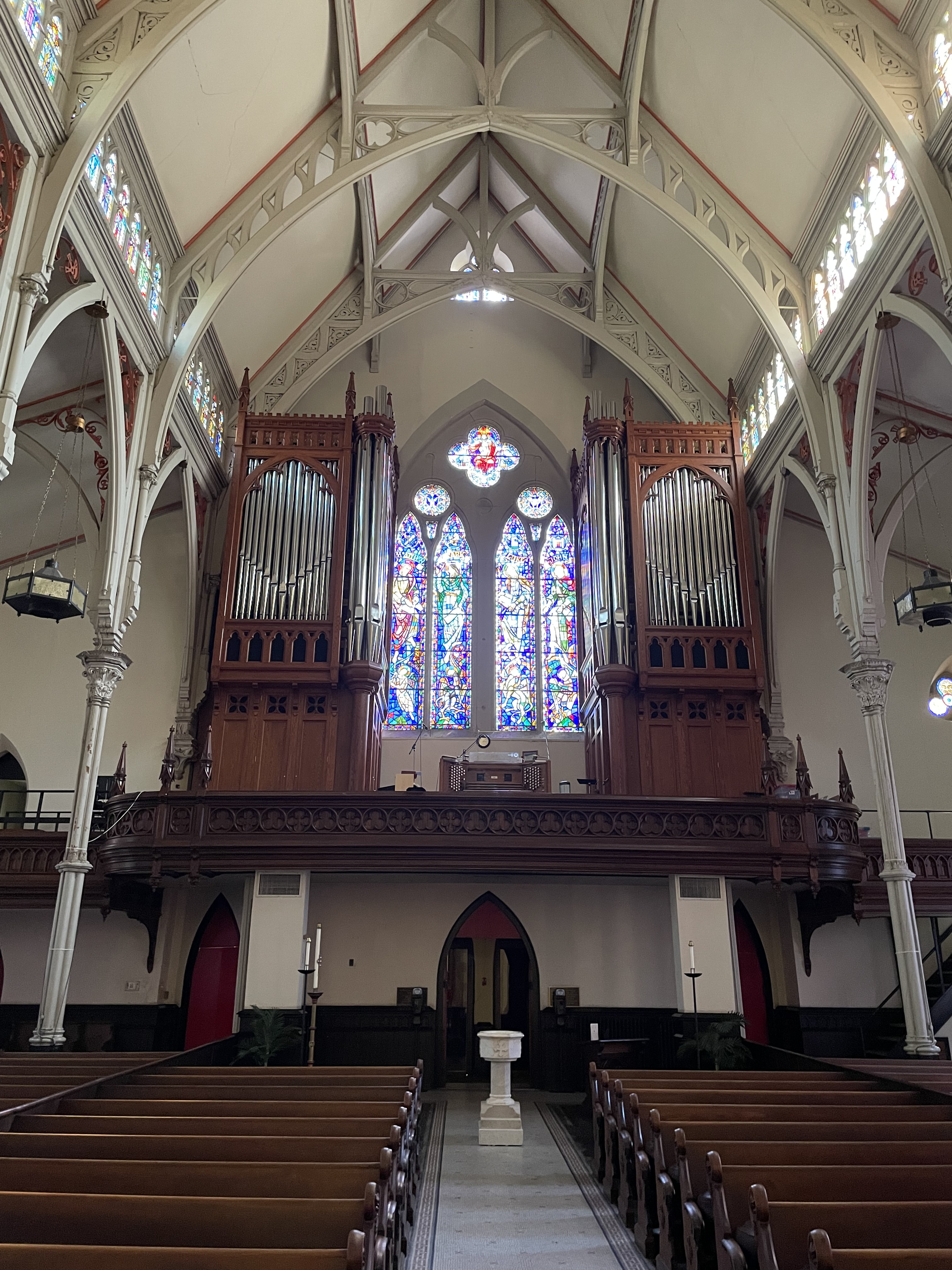
Gallery with Organ façade

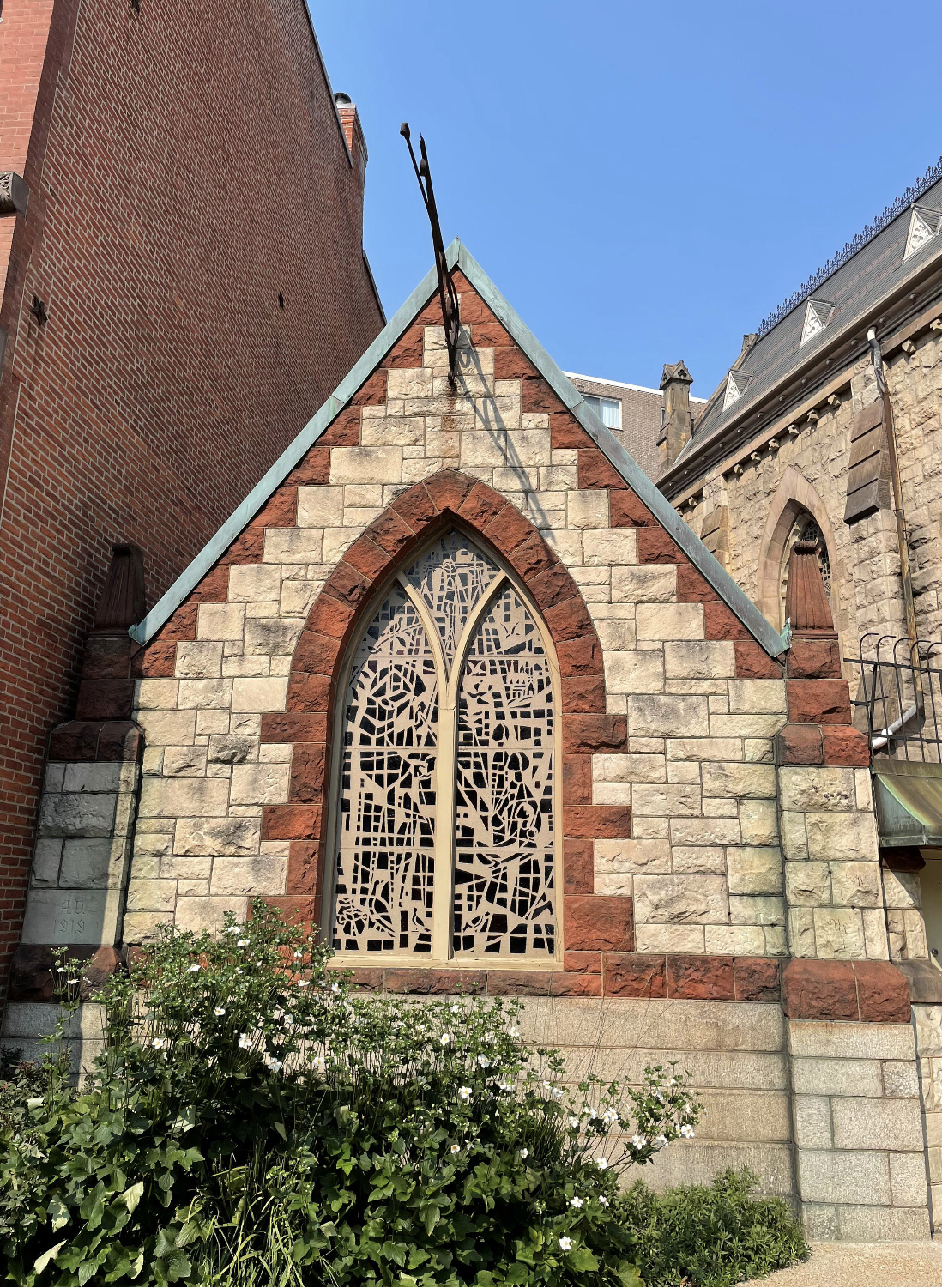
St Francis Chapel (Exterior)

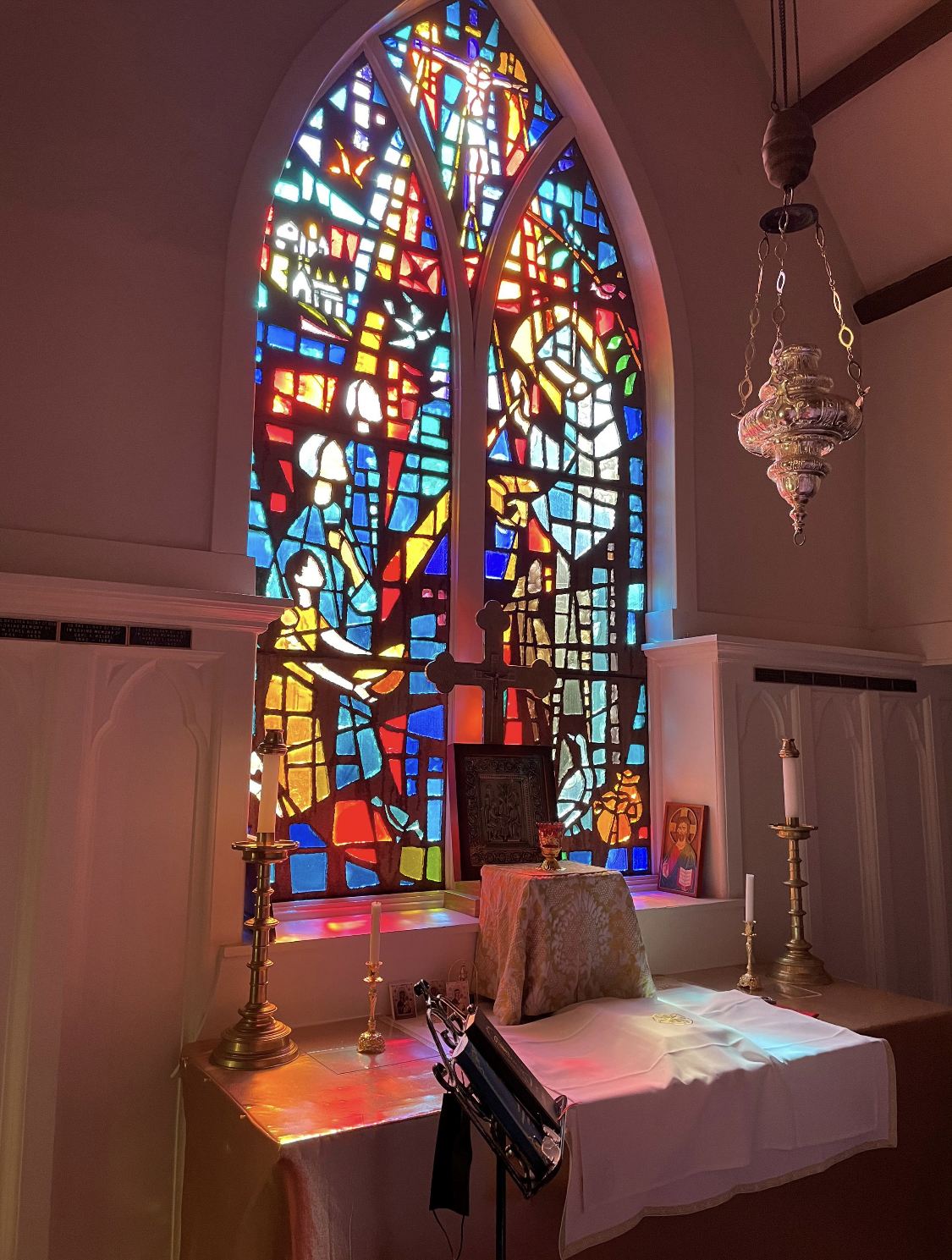
St Francis Chapel (Stained-glass window)

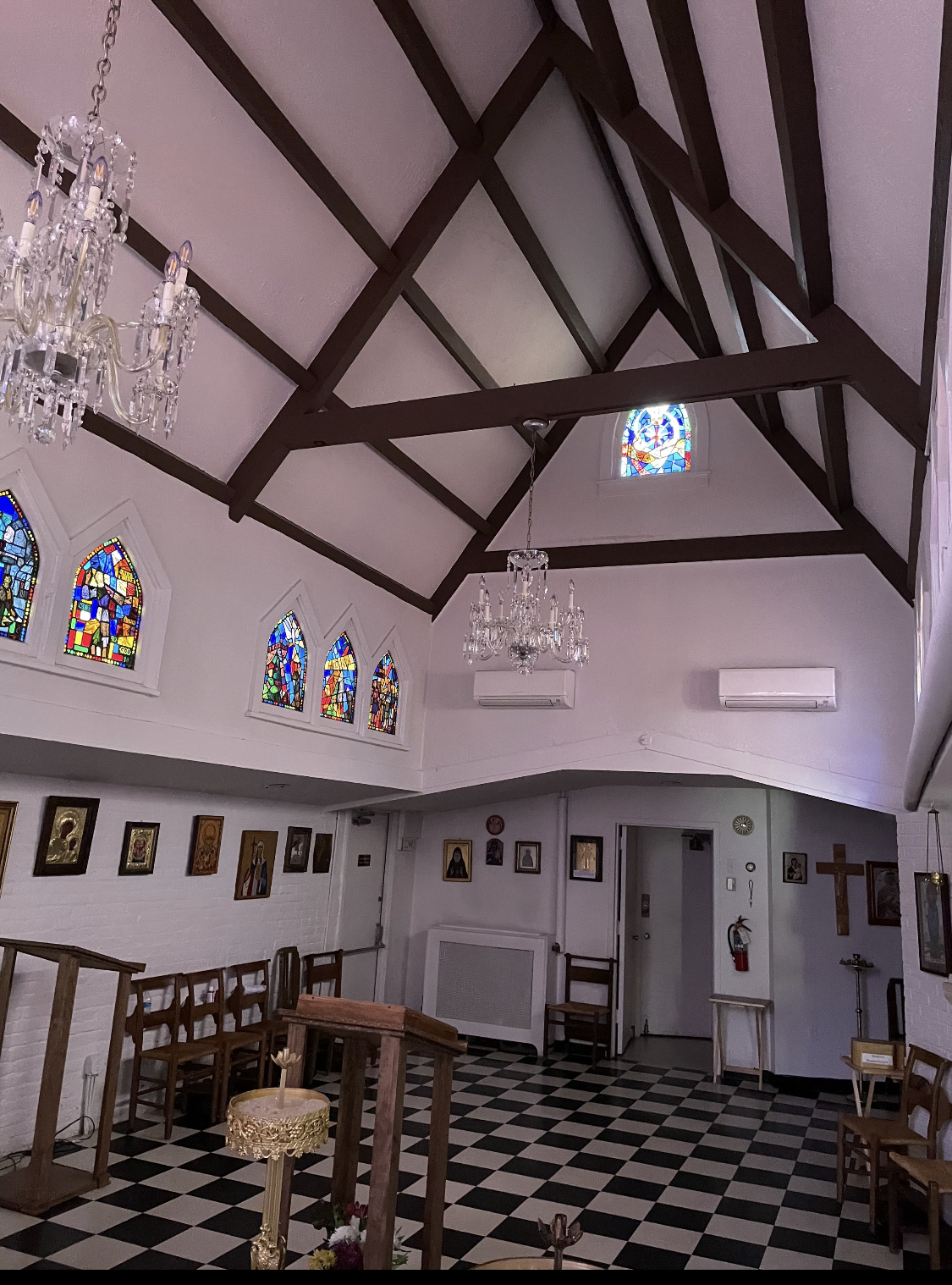
St Francis Chapel (Interior)

== See also ==
- Paul Callaway, organist and choir conductor
- Donald L. Garfield, curate
