= Sally Liberman Smith =

American educator

Sally Liberman Smith (May 7, 1929 – December 1, 2007) was an American educator. Smith founded the Lab School for children with learning difficulties in 1967. She was also a professor in the School of Education and the Head of the Graduate Program in Special Education at the American University until the time of her death.

== Life ==
=== Early years ===
Smith was born in New York City to Isaac and Bertha Liberman on Tuesday May 7, 1929. She was the youngest of four daughters and grew up in New York. Her father, Isaac, was the president of a department store, Arnold Constable and Co.

=== Education ===
In 1950 Smith graduated from Bennington College in Vermont – at the time an all women's institution. At Bennington, Smith studied dance under acclaimed modern dancer, Martha Graham. Smith also studied under Erich Fromm in the area of psychoanalytics. Her first published book was born under Fromm's guidance: A Child's Guide to a Parent's Mind, 1951. Smith subsequently received a master's degree in education from New York University in 1955. Smith then became a professor at the School of Education at the American University and ran the Masters Program focused on learning disabilities.

=== Professional life ===
After receiving her master's degree, Smith worked for the World Health Organization and lived abroad, moving with Robert Smith who was in the Foreign Service. While traveling, she wrote her second book: Nobody Said It's Easy: Can the Years Between 13 and 19 Be the Best Year's of a Child's Life?, 1965. In 1967, when Smith's youngest son, Gary, was in first grade, Smith discovered the extent of Gary's learning disabilities that were hindering him from excelling in school in the same way as his peers. Motivated by the lack of services for children like Gary, Smith started the Lab School with a few children from her neighborhood. Smith observed her son's interaction and progress during the themed birthday parties she would throw. She used this idea and technique to create an interactive classroom.

The Academic Club Method was created by Smith during the first years of the Lab School as more and more parents enrolled their children at the school. As Smith became the director of the Lab School, she also took on the role of professor and head of the Learning Disabilities Masters program at the American University in Washington. In 1983, the Lab School moved to a more permanent residence and the success gave birth to a fund raising campaign in 1984 connecting famous figures with learning disabilities to supporting the school's efforts. In 2000, another campus of the Lab School opened in Baltimore to accommodate the growing interest of parents with learning disabled children. Smith established the Academic Club Teaching Service (ACTS) in 2005 to train educators at other intuitions in the Academic Club Method.

== Philosophy ==
Sally Smith held a strong belief in the ability of all children to learn and discover their talents, believing that traditional education reaches a certain sector of the population but innovative methods are needed to help unlock the talent within children with learning abilities outside of that spectrum. The Lab School model uses art-infused academic coursework in such a way as to address the specific neurological passageways in the brains of students with learning disabilities. Smith found that often these children have a higher I.Q. than their peers and, thus, require stimulation for critical thinking and logic-based approaches to learning. Smith also believed highly in the importance of enjoyment in the learning process and often spoke of the joy expressed by her students in coming to the Lab School.

== Publications ==
Sally Smith authored ten books, numerous articles, and appeared in several videos on the Lab School and teaching methods for students with learning disabilities.

=== Books ===
- A Child's Guide to a Parent's Mind – Schuman, 1951
- Nobody Said It's Easy: Can the Years Between 13 and 19 Be the Best Years of a Child's Life? – The Macmillan Company, 1965
- Succeeding Against the Odds: How the Learning-Disabled Child Can Realize Their Promise – Tarcher/Perigee, 1993
- Different Is Not Bad, Different Is the World: A Book About Disabilities – Sopris West, 1994
- No Easy Answers: The Learning Disabled Child At Home and At School – Bantam new edition February, 1995 and Sin Respuestas Simples: El Niño con Problemas de Aprendizaje En El Hogar Y En La Escuela – Editorial Plaza Mayor, Inc., 1999
- The Power of the Arts: Creative Strategies for Teaching Exceptional Learners – Paul H Brookes Publishing, 2001
- Live It, Learn It: The Academic Club Methodology For Students With Learning Disabilities and ADHD – Brookes Publishing, 2005

=== Articles ===
- "What Do Parents of Children with Learning Disabilities, ADHD, and Related Disorders Deal With?" – Pediatric Nursing, May/June 2002 issue
- "Learning Disabilities" – Encyclopædia Britannica, 1985 Medical and Health Annual

=== Video ===
- Teach Me Different – PBS series, 2002
- Lab School: Sally Smith – Today Show, 2007

Smith was also featured in numerous publications:

- Creativity and Learning Disabilities – National Center for Learning Disabilities (NCLD), 2002
- Extraordinary Women: Fantasies Revealed 58 Women of Accomplishment Portray Hidden Dreams and Real Hopes – Stewart, Tobari, and Chang, 2005
- Teaching, Schools, and Society (8th Edition) – David Miller Sadker, Myra Pollack Sadker, Karen R. Zittleman, 2007
- Baltimore Sun, Smart Woman, Washington Home and Garden Magazine, American, the magazine of American University, Washington's Finest magazine, Education Update and Child magazine.

== Accolades ==
- Living Legacy Award: Women's International Center – 1990
- LDA Award: Learning Disabilities of Association of America – 1993
- Principal of Excellence: Washington Post – 1999
- 25 Years of Outstanding Service: American University – 2001
- Mentor of the Month: Learning Disabled Online – June 2003

== The Lab School ==
Founded by Sally Smith in 1967 the Lab School is a K-12 school for students with learning disabilities and ADHD. A second Lab School was founded in 2000 in Baltimore, MD

== See also ==
- The Lab School of Washington
- Lab School of Baltimore
- Baltimore Lab School
