= Edenton Street United Methodist Church =

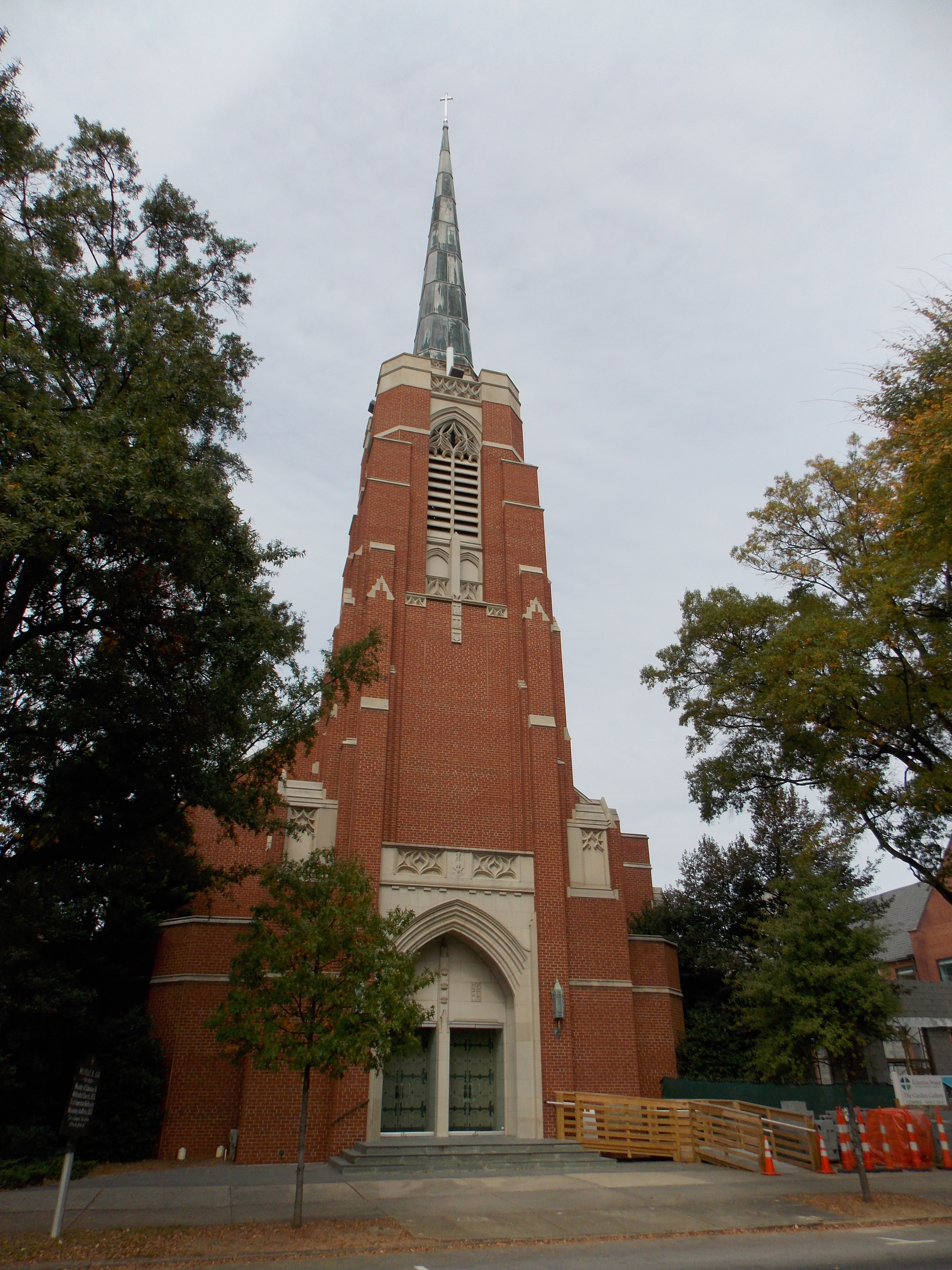
- Edenton Street United Methodist Church
- Location: 228 West Edenton Street; Raleigh, North Carolina
- Denomination: United Methodist Church
- Website: www.esumc.org

Edenton Street United Methodist Church is a historic United Methodist church in Raleigh, North Carolina, United States, where over 1,500 people gather to worship each Sunday. Edenton Street Church was one of the first churches built in the city of Raleigh.

== History ==
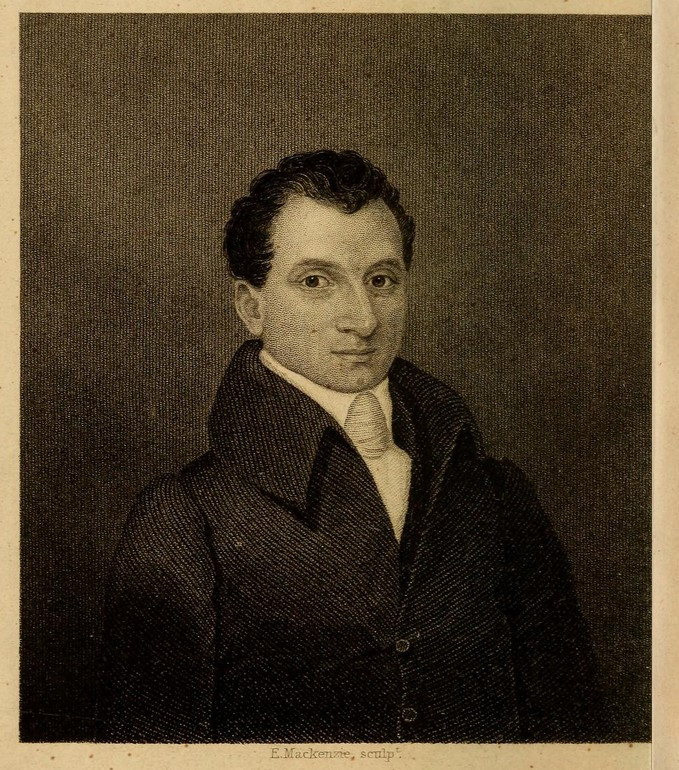
Rev. Melville B. Cox (1799-1833)

Edenton Street Church is over 200 years old. It was founded as Edenton Street Methodist Episcopal Church in 1811 after a conference of Methodist ministers in Raleigh under the leadership of Methodist Bishop Francis Asbury. One of Edenton Street's first ministers, Rev. Melville B. Cox, left his appointment at Edenton Street in 1831 to serve as the first Methodist missionary to Africa. Edenton Street Church has assisted the community throughout major national events such as the American Civil War, World War I, World War II, and the Great Depression.

Edenton Street's third sanctuary was destroyed by a fire on July 28, 1956, but that sanctuary was rebuilt. The fourth and current sanctuary of Edenton Street was first used on February 2, 1958. The Curtis Fellowship Center was completed in 2002. The Poindexter Memorial Building, which opened in 1937, stands between the sanctuary and the fellowship center. The Poindexter Memorial building contains classrooms, offices, a nursery, and the Joseph G. Brown Chapel. The church is well known for its Orgues Létourneau pipe organ in the Sanctuary.
