= Brewers Exchange =

- U.S. National Register of Historic Places
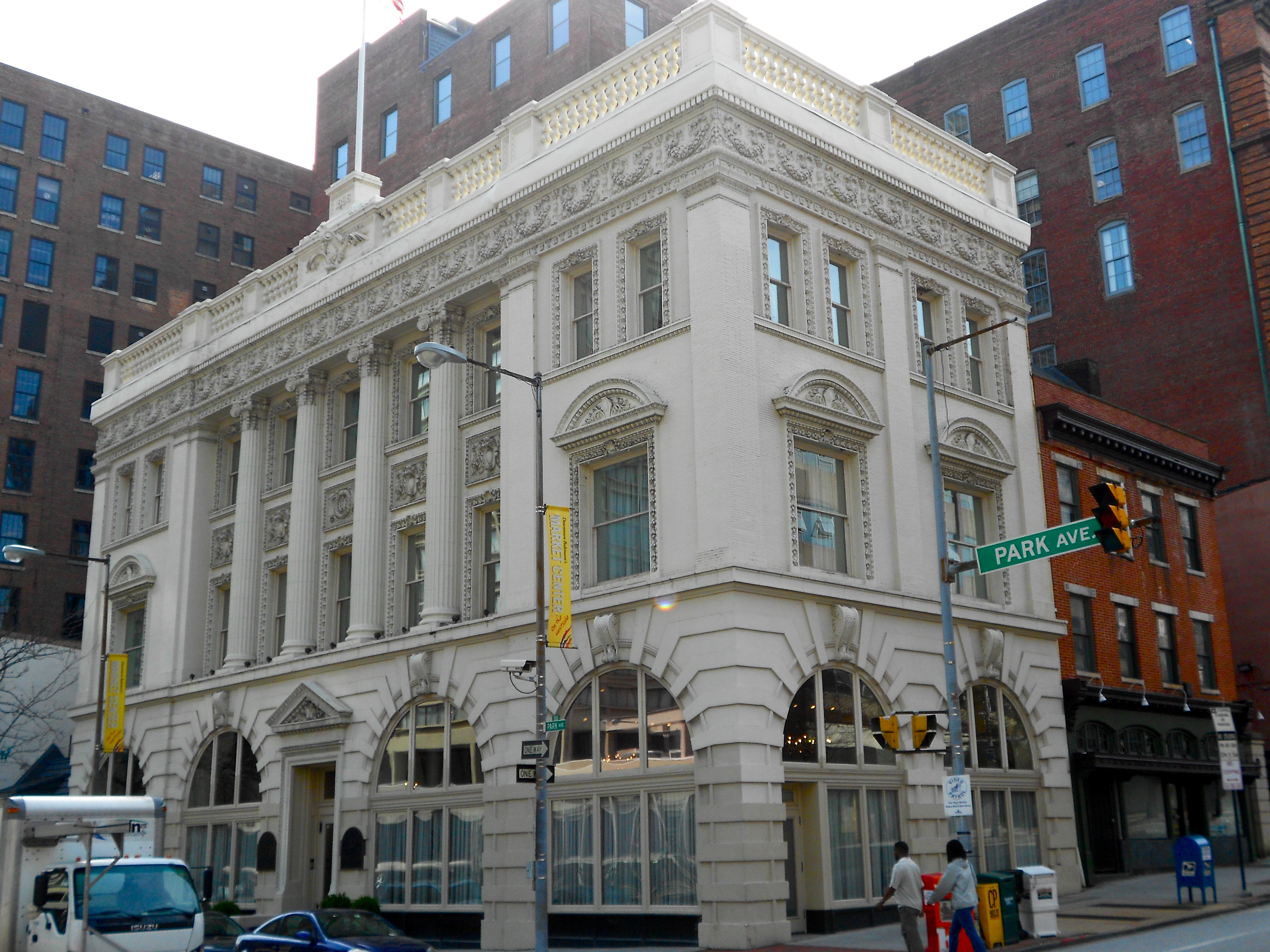
- Brewers Exchange, March 2012

- Location within Baltimore Location within Maryland Location within the United States
- Location: 20 Park Ave., Baltimore, Maryland
- Coordinates: 39°17′25.2″N 76°37′5.3″W
- Area: less than one acre
- Built: 1896
- Architects: Sperry, Joseph Evans
- Architectural style: Renaissance
- NRHP reference No.: 85000652
- Added to NRHP: March 28, 1985

Brewers Exchange, also known as Murdock Place, is a historic office building located at Baltimore, Maryland, United States. It is a three-story Renaissance Revival style building designed by Joseph Evans Sperry (1854-1930) and built in 1896. The façade is faced with terra cotta and includes such decorative elements as two-story half-round Ionic pilasters, cartouches, pediments, window surrounds, a garland frieze, and a balustrade at the edges of a flat roof. It was used by the exchange for only a short time.

The building was restored by the Baltimore architectural firm Lapicki / Smith Associates in 1985 for use as the East Coast headquarters of the Murdock Development Company at which time it was listed on the National Register of Historic Places in 1985.
