= Equitable Building (Baltimore) =

Mixed-use historic building in Baltimore, Maryland, USA

General information
- Status: Completed
- Type: Mixed-use, primarily residential
- Architectural style: Renaissance Revival style
- Location: 10 North Calvert Street, Baltimore, Maryland, United States
- Coordinates: 39°17′24.9″N 76°36′45.8″W|
- Construction started: 1891
- Completed: 1893

Technical details
- Floor count: 10
- Floor area: 225,000 square feet (20,900 m^{2})

Design and construction
- Architects: Charles L. Carson and Joseph Evans Sperry

The Equitable Building is a mixed-use historic building at 10 North Calvert Street in downtown Baltimore, Maryland. Constructed from 1891 to 1893, this 10-story, 225,000-square-foot building was Baltimore's first skyscraper and is the oldest surviving building in Monument Square. The Equitable was designed in the Italian Renaissance Revival style by Charles L. Carson and Joseph Evans Sperry and built by Norcross Brothers. The building was converted from commercial offices to a mixed-use space in 2015.

== Architecture and history ==
The Equitable Building was the first skyscraper in Baltimore when it was constructed between 1891 and 1893 at the southwest corner of North Calvert and East Fayette Streets in downtown Baltimore. It sits on the site of the former Barnum’s City Hotel, a renowned luxury hotel that closed in 1889 and was demolished in 1890. At 10 stories and 225,000 square feet, the Equitable was the first Baltimore building constructed with a “cage” of cast-iron girders and columns supporting steel floor beams independent from the building's exterior framing. Designed in the Italian Renaissance Revival style by respected Baltimore architects Charles L. Carson and Joseph Evans Sperry and constructed by the Norcross Brothers, it incorporates Sullivanesque elements.

The Equitable was the first large building in Baltimore used exclusively for offices. It originally housed 328 offices on the upper floors and five on the ground floor, along with bank vaults, a rooftop restaurant and garden, and retail spaces on the ground floor. The building was constructed to be fireproof, though its luxurious interior was destroyed in the Great Baltimore Fire of 1904. Norcross Brothers completely rebuilt the interior at a cost of $570,000. Materials used in construction included Worcester mottled granite, buff brick, and white terracotta. After 122 years of commercial use, the Equitable was converted into a mixed-use property in 2015, with approximately 180 rental apartments and 26,000 square feet of retail space. The renovations cost about $30 million.

The Calvert Building and Construction Company owned the Equitable through 1952. From 1952 to 2004, the building passed through a series of owners until acquired by a Baltimore-based real estate company owned by developer Richard Naing, which continues to own the building as of 2025.
