= James E. Hooper House =

Historic house in Maryland, United States

- U.S. National Register of Historic Places
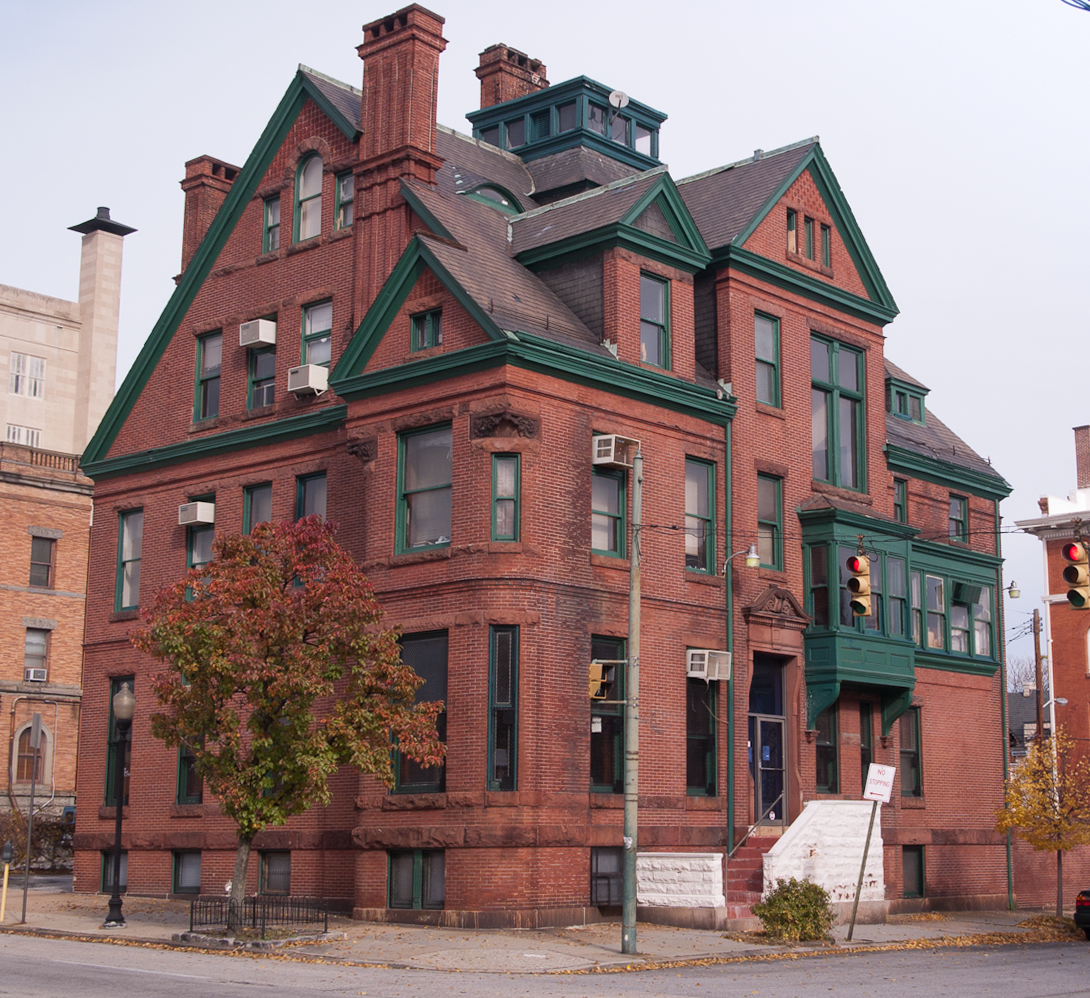
- James E. Hooper in November 2008

- Location within Baltimore Location within Maryland Location within the United States
- Location: 100 E. 23rd St., Baltimore, Maryland
- Coordinates: 39°18′56″N 76°36′56″W
- Area: less than one acre
- Built: 1886
- Architect: Carson, Charles L.; Bennett, Benjamin Franklin
- Architectural style: Queen Anne
- NRHP reference No.: 82004746
- Added to NRHP: March 15, 1982

James E. Hooper House is a historic home located at Baltimore, Maryland, United States. It is a large Queen Anne style freestanding masonry structure, situated among the buildings of the Old Goucher College Buildings complex. It is a rectangular building with a steeply pitched gable roof, a small, two-story wing extending, and a 2 1/2-story bay window extension, with a small gable roof. There are two stories in the main section of the house, and two more stories in the gable. It is constructed of dark red bricks with terra cotta, brownstone, and granite trim. The exterior features a slate shingle roof, and a square oriel, three bays wide and one bay deep, made of wood, and painted green. The house was constructed in 1886 for James E. Hooper (1839–1908).

James E. Hooper House was listed on the National Register of Historic Places in 1982. In 2001, the building was purchased by Morphius Development Consortium, who returned the exterior wood trim to its original green color and restored other various interior features, including multiple pocket doors and hand cut decorative wooden wall panels. In 2018 James Hooper LLC an entity formed by MO/DE a moniker for Matt Oppenheim Development purchased the property with the goal of establishing the property as a cultural hub and a place for small businesses to call their home.

A large fire burned through the attic on September 17, 2022, destroying many artworks inside. Subsequently, it was restored and converted to a restaurant.

== See also ==
- National Register of Historic Places listings in Baltimore
