= Norcross Factory =

- East Worcester School-Norcross Factory
- U.S. National Register of Historic Places
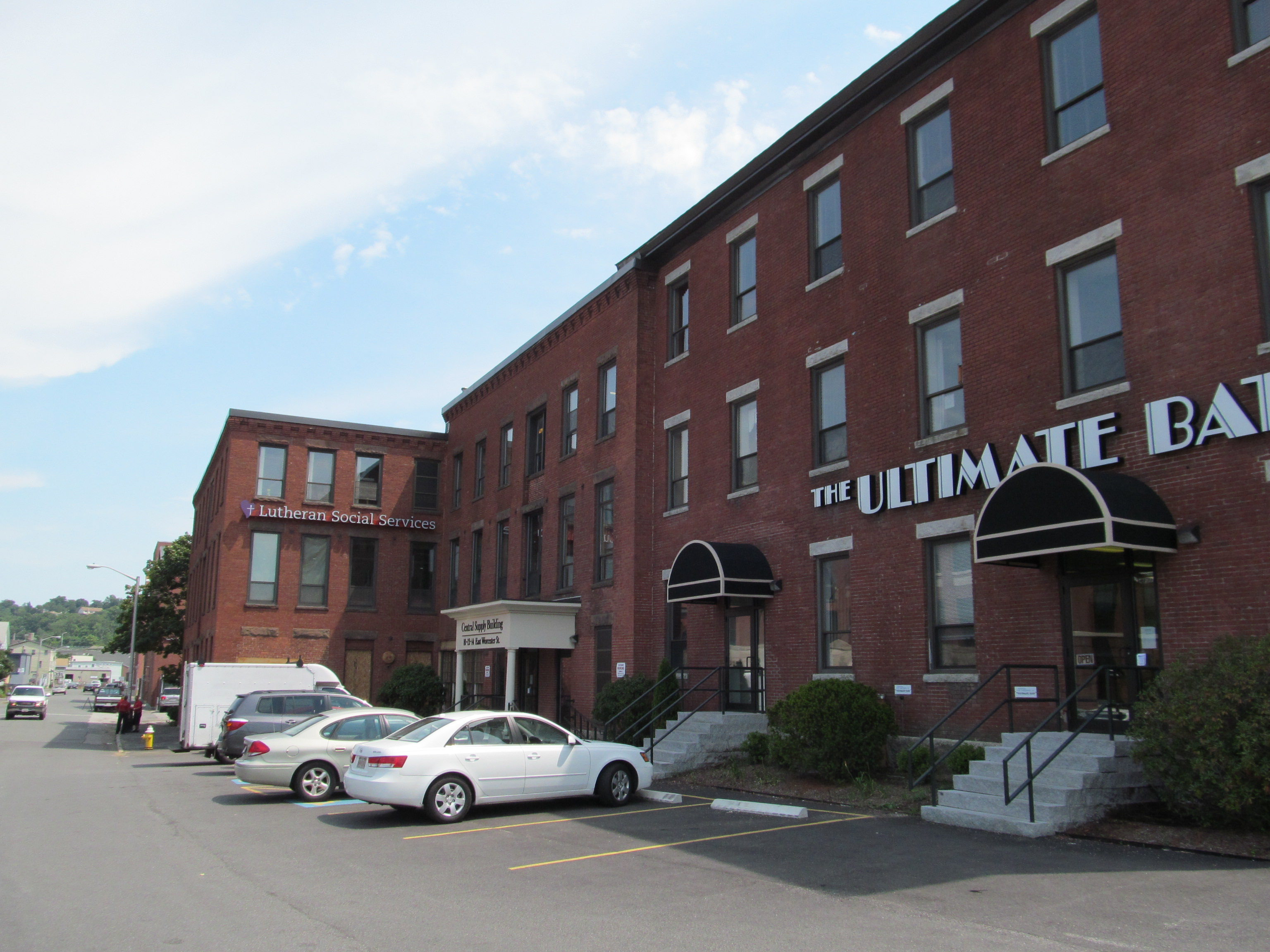
- East Worcester School-Norcross Factory

- Location within Massachusetts Location within the United States
- Location: 10 E. Worcester St., Worcester, Massachusetts
- Coordinates: 42°15′45″N 71°47′26″W
- Built: 1863
- Architect: E. Boyden & Son
- Architectural style: Utilitarian Brick
- MPS: Worcester MRA
- NRHP reference No.: 80000618
- Added to NRHP: March 05, 1980

The Norcross Factory is a historic building at 10 E. Worcester Street in Worcester, Massachusetts. Built in stages beginning 1863, this structure includes one of the city's oldest school buildings, the East Worcester Grammar School, and represents an adaptive reuse of the building, serving from 1893 to 1918 as the main facility of the Norcross Brothers, a firm best known for its construction of H. H. Richardson designs. The building was listed on the National Register of Historic Places in 1980.

== Description and history ==
The former East Worcester School and Norcross Factory is set on Worcester's east side, at the junction of Shrewsbury Street and East Worcester Street, just north of Worcester's main railroad yard and east of Interstate 290. This three story brick building was built in three stages, between 1863 and 1893. The oldest portion, the westernmost part of the structure, was originally built as a schoolhouse, and is one of the oldest surviving school buildings in the city. It was designed by E. Boyden & Son, based on an earlier school (no longer extant) on Salem Street. This section has a hip roof, paired entrances on the north and south facades, and granite window surrounds. It served as the East Worcester Grammar School until 1893.

The school was purchased by the Norcross Brothers in 1893, and connected via additions to a planing mill they had built on an adjacent parcel in 1880-81. Both the additions and the planing mill are modest three-story brick structures, with flat roofs, corbelled cornices, and sandstone trim. This space was then used by the Norcrosses to as office space, and factory space in which they manufactured architectural building parts, including doors and window sashes, until 1918.

== See also ==
- National Register of Historic Places listings in eastern Worcester, Massachusetts
