= Cambridge Historic District, Wards I and III =

Historic district in Maryland, US

- U.S. National Register of Historic Places
- U.S. Historic district
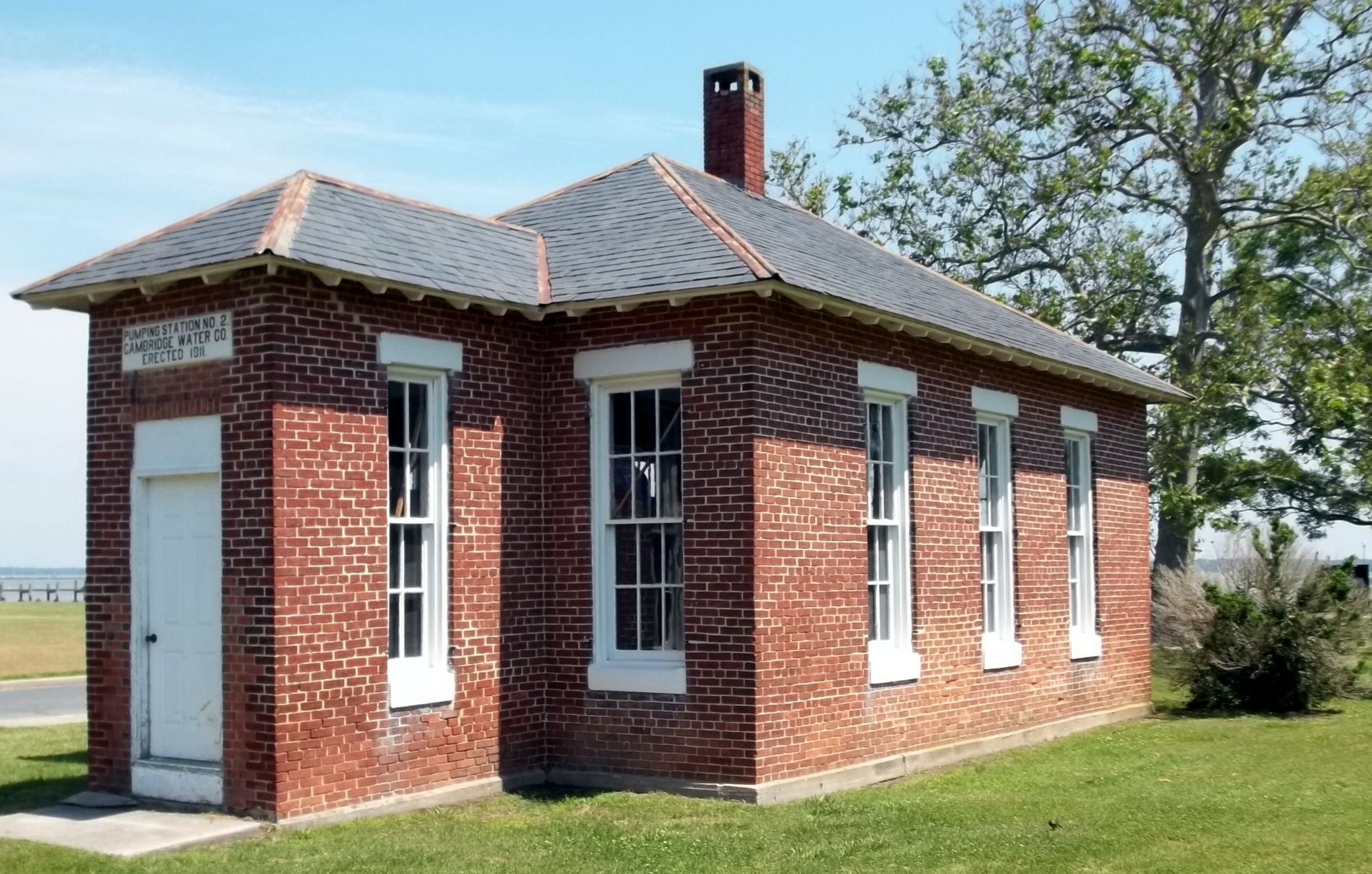
- Water Street Pumping Station

- Location within Maryland Location within the United States
- Location: Roughly bounded by Glasgow, Glenburn, Poplar, Race, and Gay Sts. and the Choptank River, Cambridge, Maryland
- Coordinates: 38°34′39″N 76°4′45″W
- Area: 175 acres (71 ha)
- Architect: Brown, J. Benjamin; Carson, Charles L.; Upjohn, Richard
- Architectural style: Colonial Revival, Queen Anne, Georgian
- NRHP reference No.: 90001370
- Added to NRHP: September 5, 1990

Cambridge Historic District, Wards I and III is a national historic district in Cambridge, Dorchester County, Maryland. It is a large residential, commercial, and governmental area in the northwest section of the city. It consists of buildings from the late 18th through the mid 20th century. Residential building styles include Georgian, Queen Anne, Colonial Revival, and American Foursquare. The district includes the Italian Villa style courthouse designed by Richard Upjohn.

It was added to the National Register of Historic Places in 1990.
