= Baltimore Lab School =

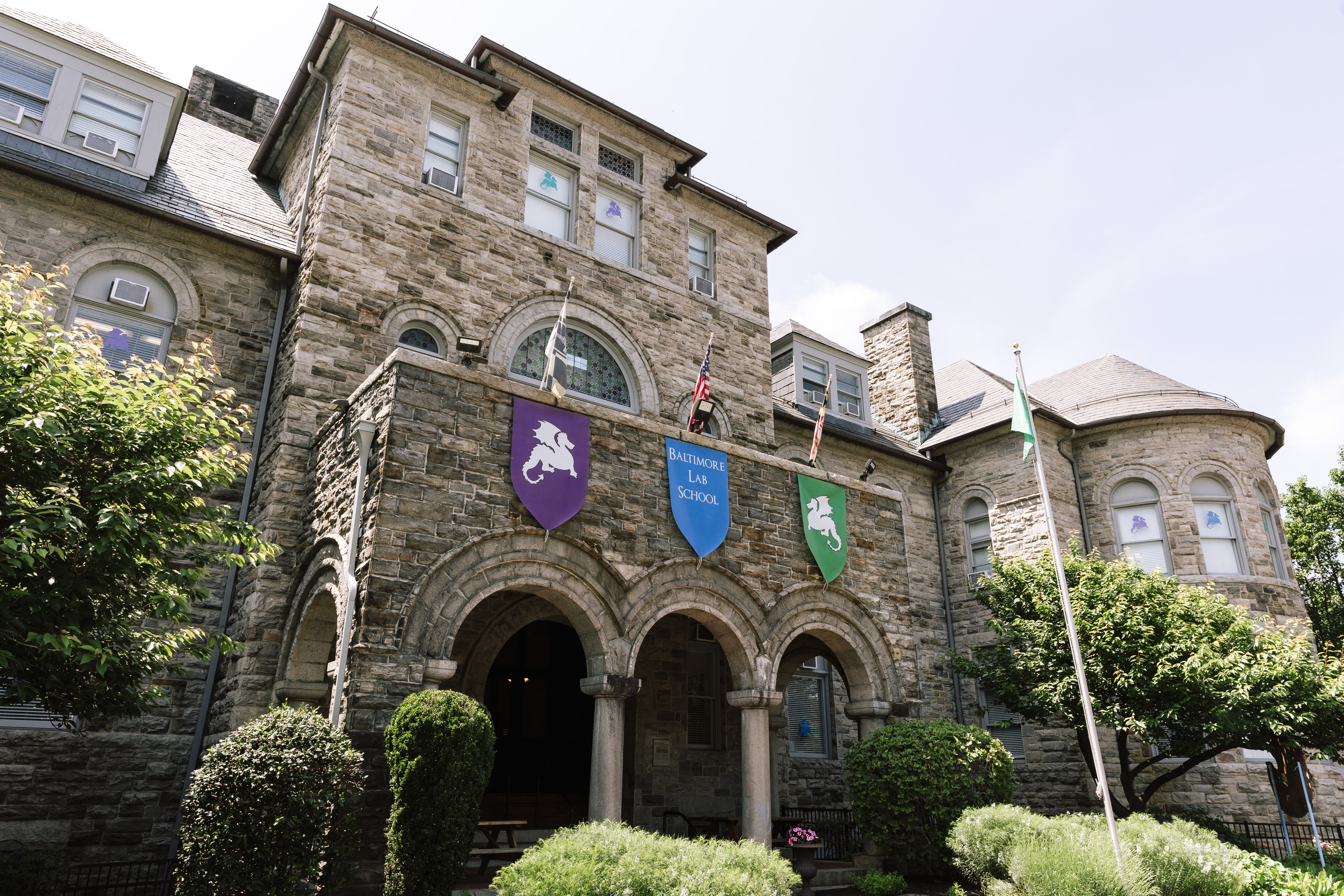
- Old Goucher Hall Building is the home of Baltimore Lab School.

Location
- 2220 St. Paul Street; Baltimore, Maryland; United States; 39°18′54″N 76°36′56″W

Information
- Former names: Goucher College
- Type: Nonpublic, Special Education
- Established: 2000
- Head of School: Steve Buettner
- Faculty: 65
- Grades: 1-12
- Enrollment: 125
- Average class size: 6
- Campus: Urban, 1-acre (4,000 m^{2})
- Colors: Blue, Purple, Green
- Mascot: Dragon
- Website: baltimorelabschool.org

Baltimore Lab School (BLS) is a nonpublic special education school for children diagnosed with learning disabilities and ADHD in grades 1–12. It is located in Baltimore, Maryland, in Goucher Hall, one of the historic Old Goucher College Buildings. The school was founded in September 2000 as a division of its parent school in Washington D.C., The Lab School of Washington. Both schools were founded by Sally L. Smith, a nationally recognized leader in special education, who then continued as their administrator until her death in 2007.

BLS offers its students and the public clinical services, including speech-language therapy, occupational therapy, and counseling services. Individual or small group related service sessions are offered on an outpatient basis or through pull-out or push-in services for an extra fee. All students are able to benefit from these on-site specialists through services integrated into the classroom. In addition to related services and specialized instruction, students may be provided intervention by working with reading specialists and math specialists. BLS offers a low student-to-staff ratio, multi-sensory curriculum, and an arts-integrated methodology.

BLS is a training site for interns from Loyola University, Towson University, Goucher College, and Maryland Institute College of Art. These students complete an internship under the supervision of Baltimore Lab's teaching staff. Baltimore Lab School faculty members are invited to speak at local universities and professional conferences.

The school also offers after-school activities and sports, such as indoor rock-climbing, tennis, track and field, basketball, and swimming, as well as many field trips to further enhance the learning experience of students. BaLS also partners with the Chesapeake Bay Foundation to organize a multitude of outdoor learning experiences for students of all ages and is a certified Green School.

In March 2014, Baltimore Lab School began operating fully independently from Lab School of Washington. The building that houses the school was purchased from Washington Lab.
