= Young Men's and Young Women's Hebrew Association Building =

Historic building in Maryland, USA

- U.S. National Register of Historic Places
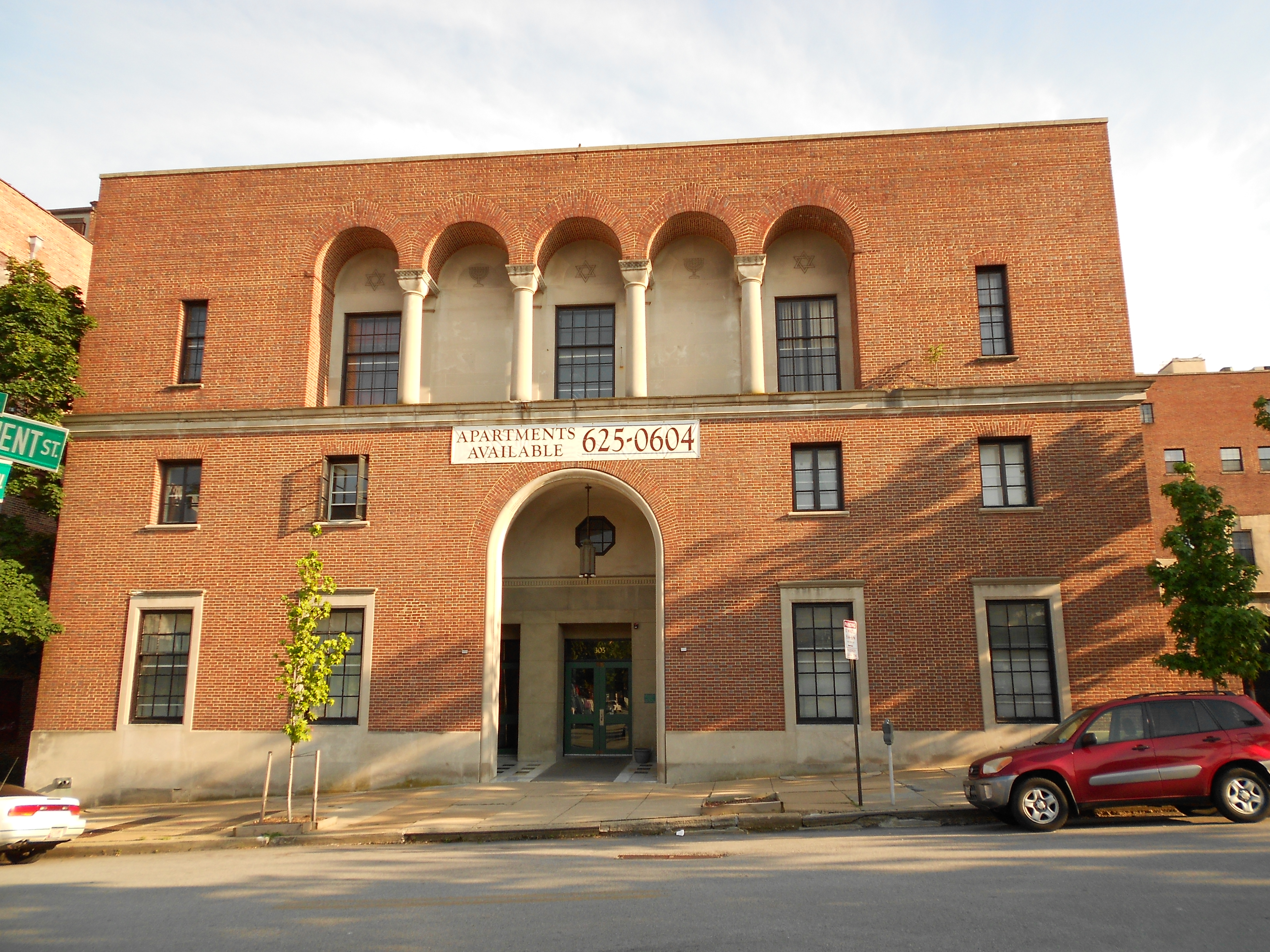

- Location within Baltimore Location within Maryland Location within the United States
- Location: 305--311 W. Monument St., Baltimore, Maryland
- Coordinates: 39°17′50″N 76°37′15″W
- Area: less than one acre
- Built: 1930
- Architect: Joseph Evans Sperry
- NRHP reference No.: 85002836
- Added to NRHP: November 14, 1985

Young Men's and Young Women's Hebrew Association Building, also known as the Jewish Community Center, is a historic building located in central Baltimore, Maryland, United States. It is a three-story, flat-roofed, rectangular-shaped Flemish bond brick structure completed in 1930. The exterior features Moorish and Jewish motifs, such as the Star of David. It was designed by Baltimore architect Joseph Evans Sperry. It is now an apartment building. The establishment of the joining YM/YWHA building was a notable example of an attempt to bridge the divide between uptown Baltimore's prosperous German Jews and East Baltimore's impoverished Eastern European and Russian Jews. The association building was constructed midway between uptown and East Baltimore to symbolize this coming together of the two halves of Baltimore's Jewish community.

The Young Men's and Young Women's Hebrew Association Building was listed on the National Register of Historic Places in 1985. It is included in the Baltimore National Heritage Area.
