= Dorchester County Courthouse and Jail =

- U.S. National Register of Historic Places
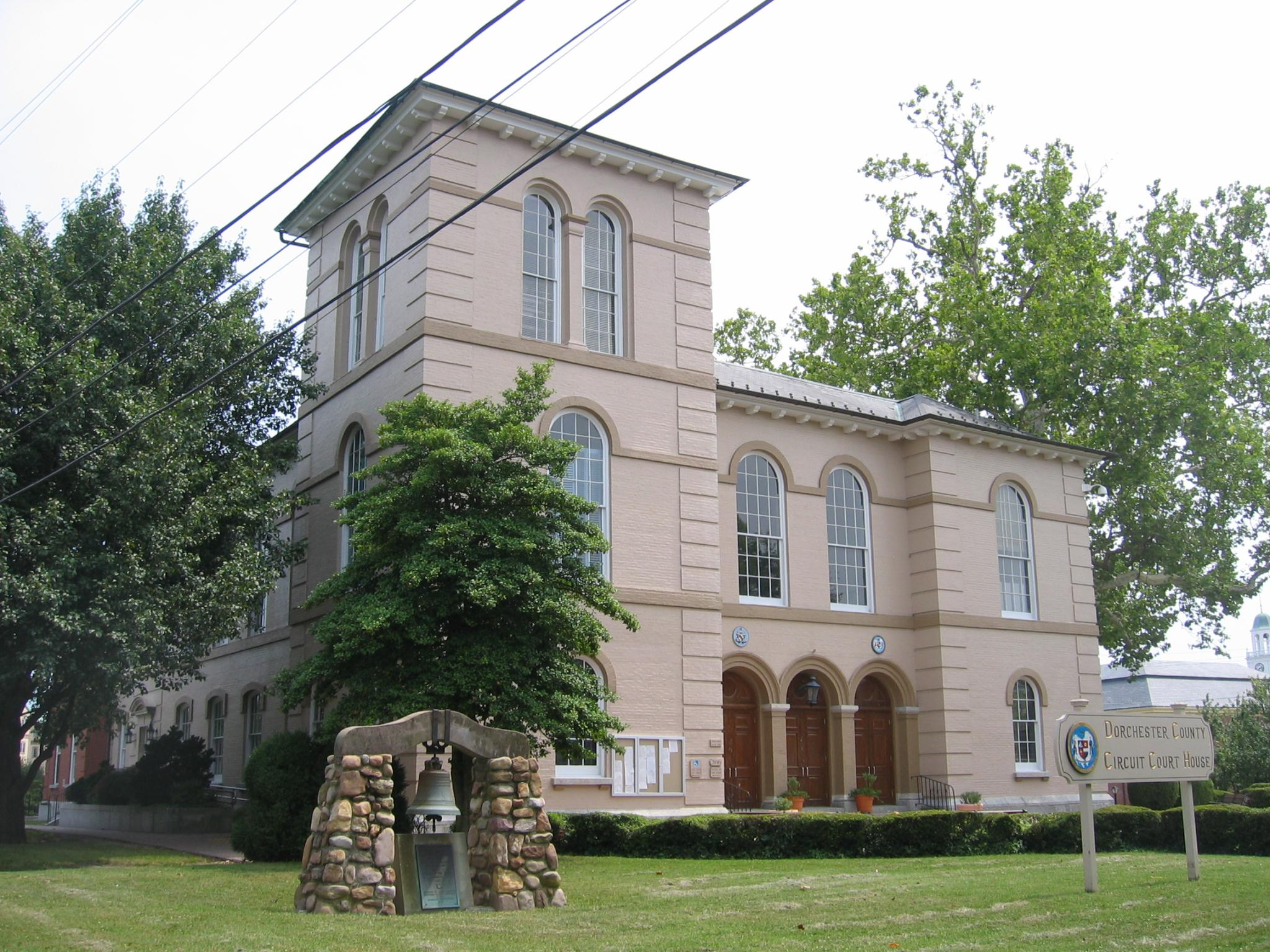

- Location within Maryland Location within the United States
- Location: 206 High St., Cambridge, Maryland
- Coordinates: 38°34′18″N 76°4′34″W
- Area: 0.1 acres (0.040 ha)
- Built: 1853
- Architect: UpJohn, Richard; Carson, Charles L.
- Architectural style: Queen Anne, Romanesque
- NRHP reference No.: 82001591
- Added to NRHP: December 16, 1982

Dorchester County Courthouse and Jail is a historic courthouse building located at Cambridge, the county seat of Dorchester County, Maryland. It is an Italianate influenced, painted brick structure, which was enlarged and extensively remodeled with Georgian Revival decorative detailing in the 1930s. The building entrance is flanked on the north by a three-story tower. It was constructed in 1853, and is the only courthouse designed by Richard Upjohn in Maryland.

The County Jail, which stood to the southeast of the courthouse from about 1882 until its demolition in 1994, was a Queen Anne and Romanesque Revival style granite structure with brick and terra cotta features. The jail was the work of the Baltimore architect, Charles L. Carson.

It was listed on the National Register of Historic Places in 1982.
