= Joseph Evans Sperry =

American architect

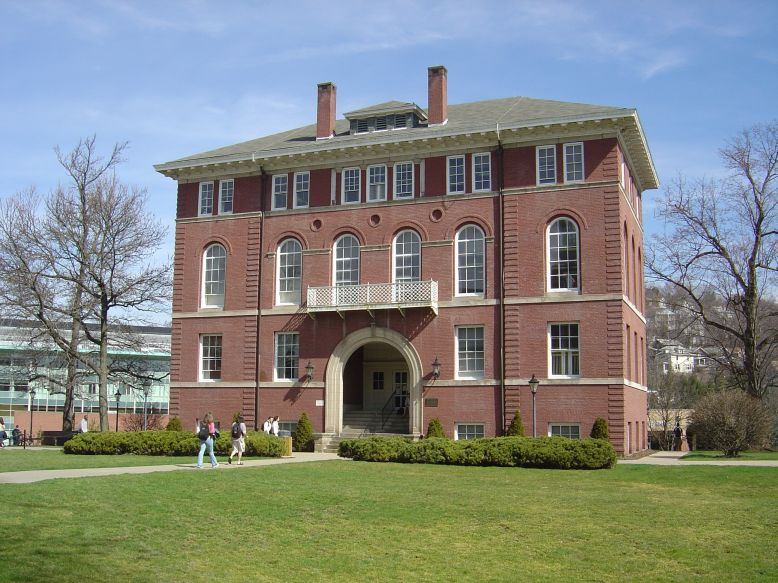
Chitwood Hall, West Virginia University campus, Morgantown, WV

Joseph Evans Sperry FAIA (1854–1930) was an American architect who is notable for designing buildings in Baltimore. He was born in Georgetown, South Carolina, and later relocated to Baltimore, Maryland, where he partnered with James Bosley Noel Wyatt to form the architectural firm Wyatt and Sperry. Their affiliation lasted from 1878 to 1887. The two probably became acquainted while working in the office of Architect, E. Francis Baldwin, where he worked from 1872 until 1876. With Wyatt, he designed a number of buildings around Baltimore. In 1888 he joined an architectural firm owned by Charles L. Carson, becoming Carson's partner and successor after the latter's death in 1891.

As an independent practitioner, Sperry became one of Baltimore's leading architects, designing many public buildings, including churches, hospitals, and banks. In 1914 he was named a Fellow of the American Institute of Architects. Sperry also designed several buildings at Johns Hopkins University and one building at West Virginia University. Sperry's most famous building is probably the Emerson "Bromo-Seltzer" Tower in Baltimore. Sperry's buildings were designed in a variety of styles, but overall were eclectic. Sperry practiced architecture independently from 1888 until he died in 1930.

== Selected works ==
- 1891: Equitable Building, Baltimore, Maryland
- 1892: Eutaw Place Temple of congregation Oheb Shalom
- 1896: Brewers Exchange, Baltimore, Maryland
- 1897: St. Mark's Lutheran Church, Baltimore, Maryland
- 1911: Emerson "Bromo-Seltzer" Tower, Baltimore, Maryland
- 1914: Maryland Hall at Johns Hopkins University's Whiting School of Engineering
- 1917: Whitehall, Narragansett, Rhode Island
- 1930: Young Men's and Young Women's Hebrew Association Building, Baltimore, Maryland
