= Orgues Létourneau =

Orgues Létourneau Limitée of Saint-Hyacinthe, Quebec is a prominent Canadian builder and restorer of pipe organs. The company was founded in 1979 by Fernand Létourneau, who served as president, owner and artistic director of the firm until 2019. In 2019, Fernand Létourneau sold the company to a long-time employee, Dudley Oakes.

The firm's work has received international recognition, and the company has been contracted to build organs for churches, schools, and concert halls in several countries, including England, New Zealand, and Australia, in addition to Canada and the United States. In 2006, the company completed its largest instrument to date, a five-manual, 144-rank instrument for the Church of St. John the Divine in Houston, Texas.

== Founder ==
Fernand Létourneau worked for Casavant Frères from 1965 to 1978. He left their employ to study the organs of France, Germany, and the Netherlands. In 1979 he returned to Quebec to establish his own firm.

== Some notable organs ==
Opus 43 (1995) of 2 manuals, 22 stops, 26 ranks and 1364 pipes for Pembroke College, Oxford.

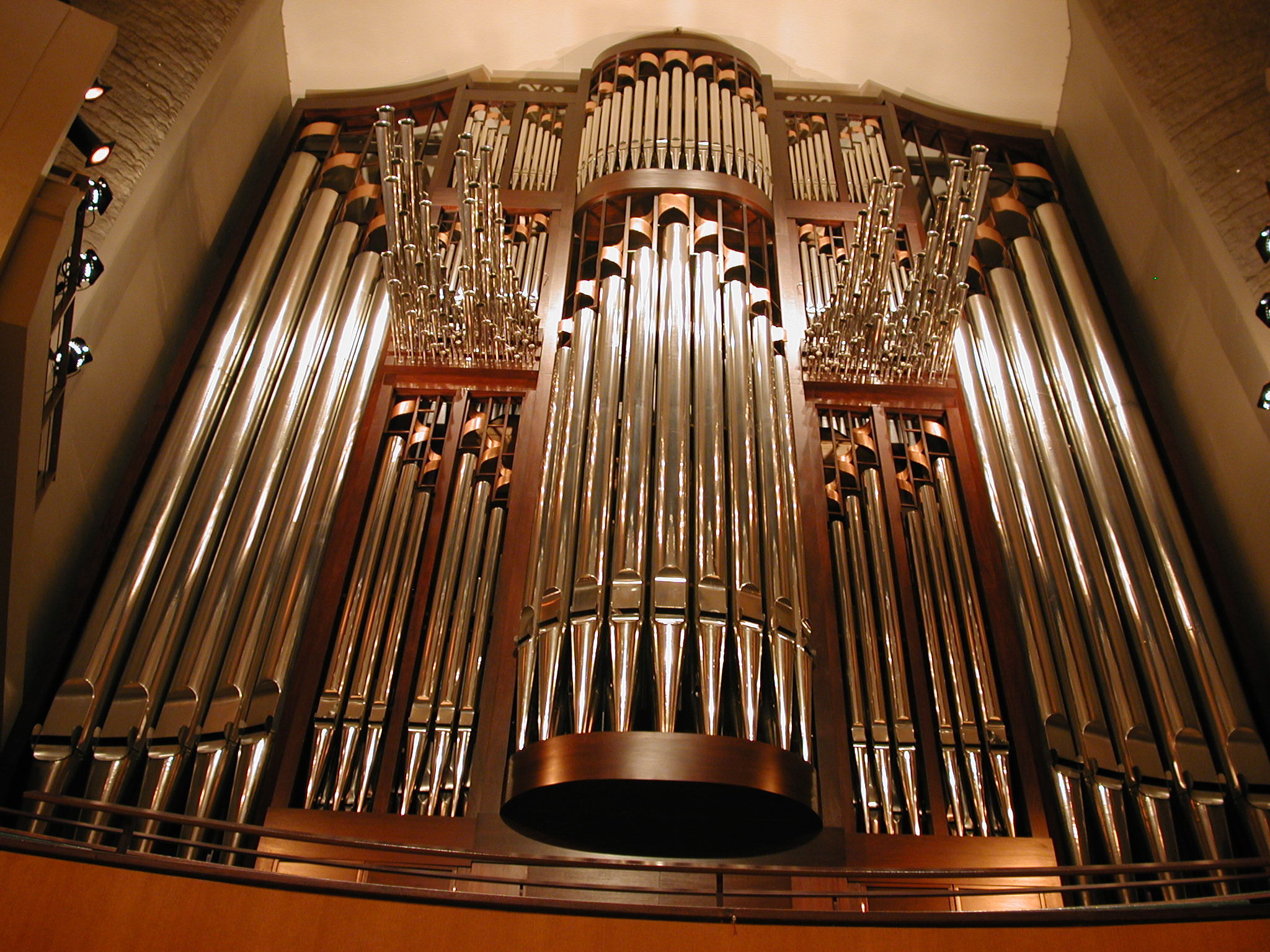
Davis Concert Organ

Opus 50 (2002), the Davis Concert Organ of 96 stops, 122 ranks, and 6,551 pipes in the Francis Winspear Centre for Music in Edmonton, Alberta.

Opus 80 (2002) of 3 manuals, 59 stops, 73 ranks, and 4,119 pipes for Lutheran Church of the Redeemer in Atlanta, Georgia.

Opus 95 (2004) of 3 manuals and 30 stops for Selwyn College, Cambridge.

Opus 97 (2005) of 5 manuals, 113 stops, 144 ranks, and 8,361 pipes for The Church of St. John the Divine, Houston, Texas.

Opus 112 (2007) of 101 stops, 98 ranks and 5,447 pipes for Edenton Street United Methodist Church, Raleigh, North Carolina.

Opus 118, of 4 manuals, 90 ranks, 68 registers, and 5,298 pipes for The Cathedral of Christ the Light, Oakland, California
