= Lab School of Washington =

Location
- 4759 Reservoir Road, NW; Washington, D.C. 20007; United States; 38°54′56″N 77°05′35″W

Information
- Type: Private school
- Established: 1967 (59 years ago)
- CEEB code: 090103
- Head of school: Kim Wargo
- Faculty: 150+
- Enrollment: 350
- Mascot: Dragon
- Tuition: 50,000
- Website: www.labschool.org

The Lab School of Washington is a small (grades 1–12) independent school in Washington, D.C. for students with language based learning differences like dyslexia. The Lab School was established in 1967 by Sally Smith. Kim Wargo has directed the school since July 2020. The Lab School of Washington has an arts centered curriculum on two campuses: one on Reservoir Road, NW for middle through high school, the other on Foxhall Road NW for elementary students.

== History ==
Although the school was not officially incorporated until 1982, Lab School of Washington cites its founding date as 1967, when Sally Liberman Smith, faced with her son Gary's learning difficulties in school, began home schooling Gary and eventually started teaching other children faced with similar learning difficulties.

At the time, Gary was a first-grader at Beauvoir elementary school who could not read and who struggled with simple math. Beginning with Gary and three other students, and originally as an extension of the Kingsbury Diagnostic Center, a testing, education and remediation facility dealing with learning difficulties and related issues, Smith started her own school to help children with dyslexia, ADHD, and other learning differences.

Borrowing ideas from the 19th century philosopher, psychologist, and education reformer John Dewey who championed progressive education, Smith also figured out through themed birthday parties that kids, even those like her son who had significant learning differences, could successfully learn through the arts.

Incorporated as its own school in 1982, The Lab School of Washington is now an independent non-profit educational institution. Its Board of Trustees headed by Ann Bradford Mathias.

== Teaching method ==
The Academic Club Methodology, a teaching method, was created by Lab School founder Sally Smith and trademarked by the school.
