= Old Goucher College Buildings =

- U.S. National Register of Historic Places
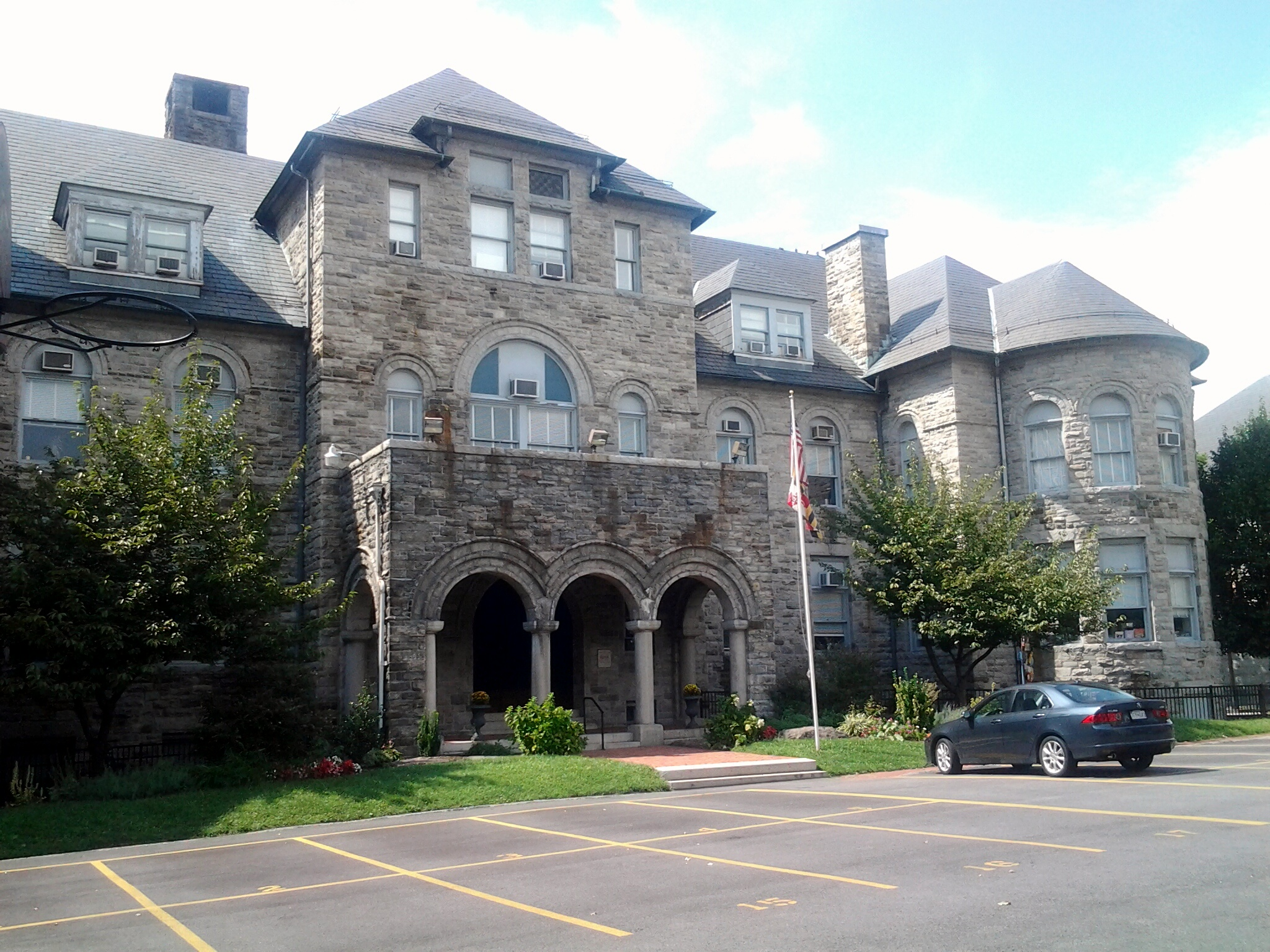
- Old Goucher College Buildings, September 2012
- Location: Roughly bounded by W. 25th St., Guilford Ave., North Ave. and Howard St., Baltimore, Maryland
- Coordinates: 39°18′52″N 76°36′59″W
- Area: 25 acres (10 ha), boundary increase 75 acres (30 ha)
- Built: 1879
- Architect: White, Stanford; Carson, Charles
- Architectural style: Queen Anne, Romanesque, Italianate, Renaissance, Romanesque, Richardsonian Romanesque
- NRHP reference No.: 78003143 (original); 94001163 (increase)

Significant dates
- Added to NRHP: August 25, 1978
- Boundary increase: September 26, 1994

Old Goucher College Buildings is a national historic district in Baltimore, Maryland, United States. It is an approximate 18-block area in the middle of Baltimore which developed in the late 19th and 20th centuries.

The neighborhood is characterized generally by two- and three-story brick row houses constructed mostly in the 19th century and several large-scale institutional and commercial buildings dating from both centuries. Stylistically, the area is characterized primarily by Italianate, Romanesque, Colonial Revival, and Art Deco influences.

The area once served as a campus for the Women's College of Baltimore, now Goucher College, until the school relocated to Towson. The school was named for clergyman John Goucher, who once served as a pastor at Lovely Lane Methodist Church.

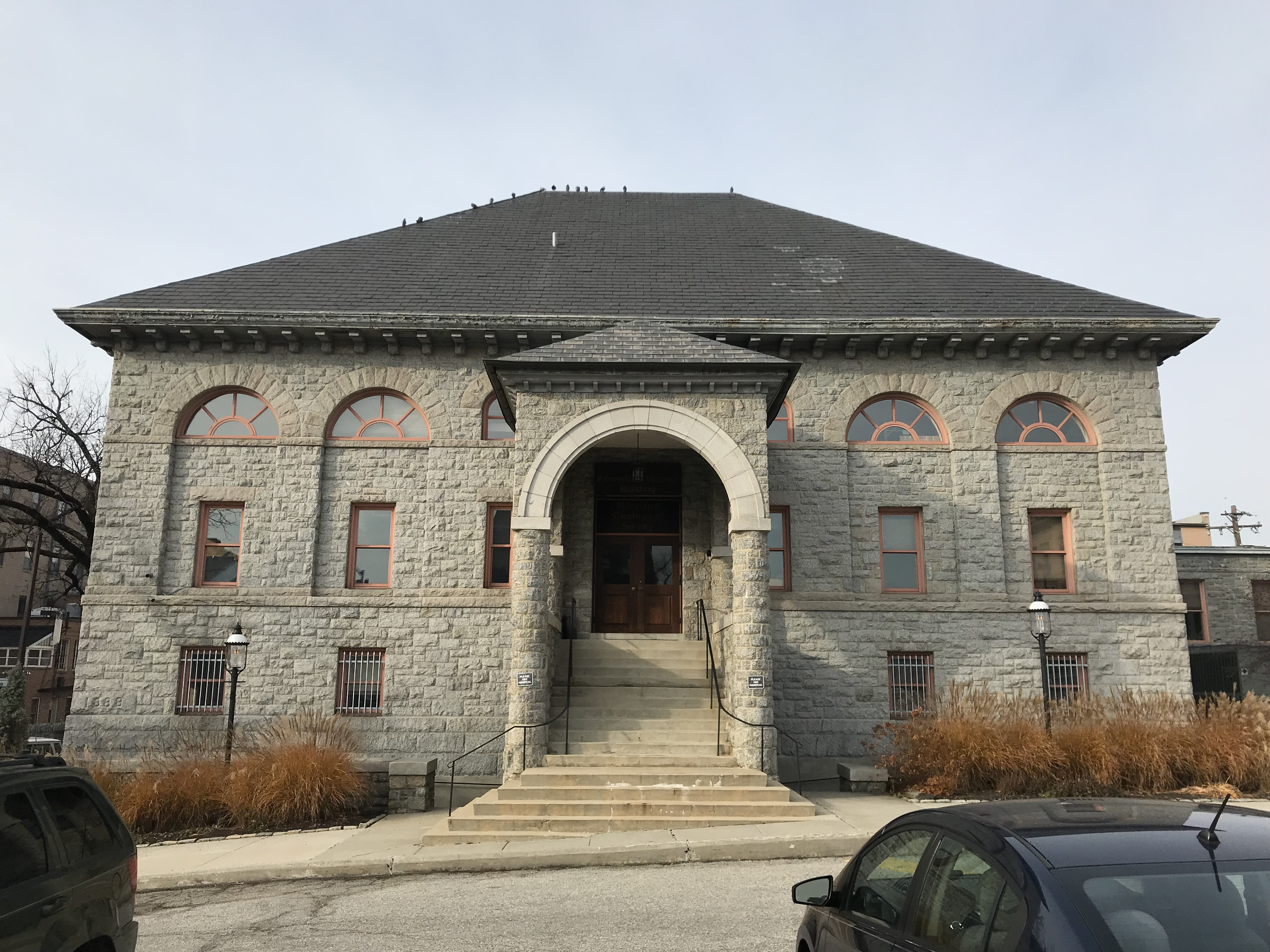
Former Goucher College Bennett Hall and Annex

The district includes a series of large scale, multiple story brick and stone structures built for college. Three buildings designed by the nationally famous architect Stanford White are found here. It was added to the National Register of Historic Places in 1978. The former main campus building has been converted into the Baltimore Lab School, and many of the other structures have been re-purposed for commercial and residential use. The site has been the focus of a number of preservation efforts by local advocacy groups.

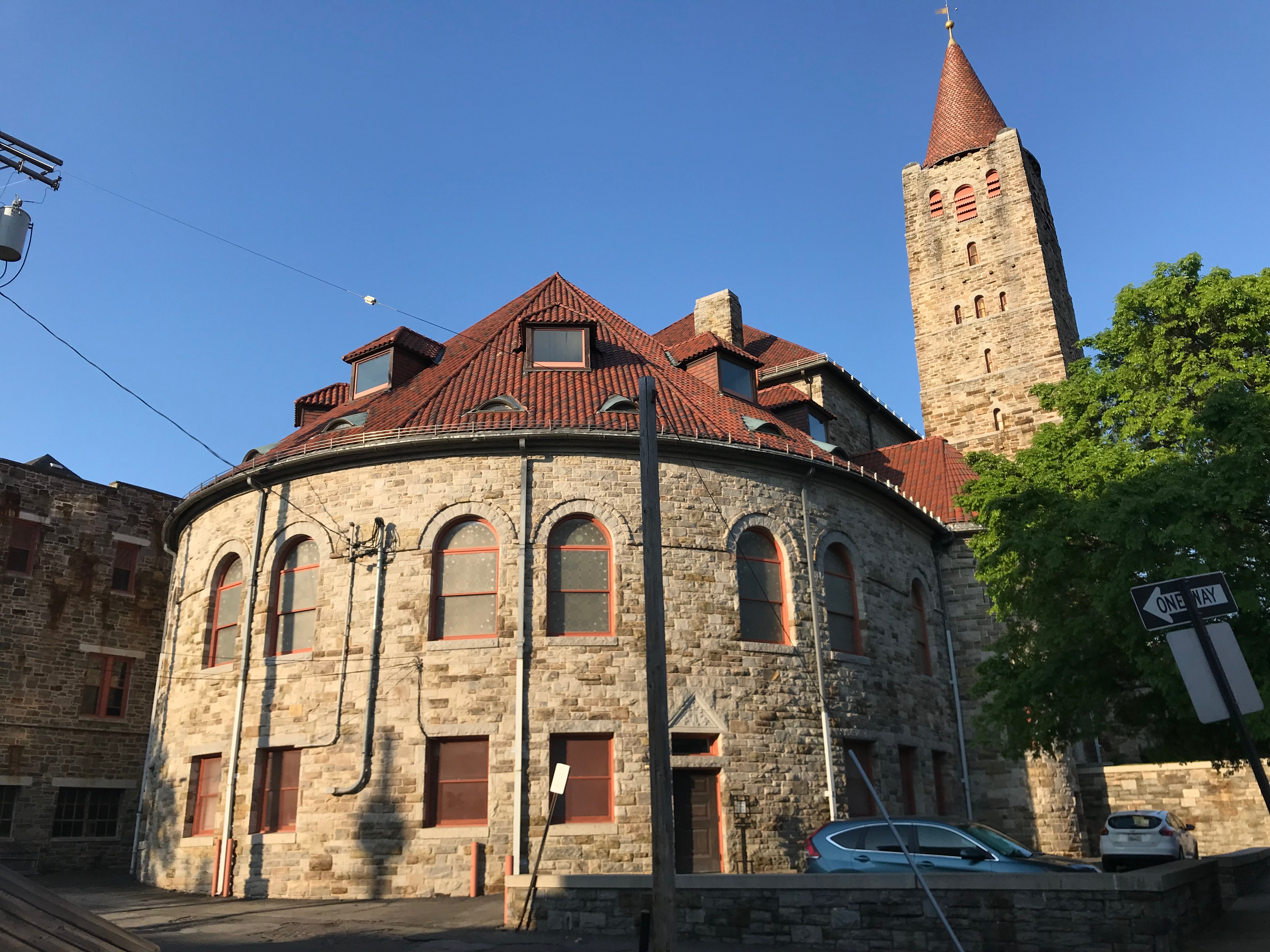
Lovely Lane Methodist Church
