= Utting (surname) =

Utting is a surname with several origins. In some cases it is a surname from Germany. As some surnames are locational in origin, it would indicate someone being from the town of Utting near the city of Munich. See Utting am Ammersee It is also linked to the surnames Otting, Ottinger and Uttinger.

In England it is of Saxon origin, so still very much Germanic. It would be derived from the Saxon word Otta meaning riches. The ‘ing’ was used in a similar way to the Scottish use of Mc/Mac or the Irish O’ meaning son of or belonging to. So as Otta would’ve meant ‘Riches’ Utting would indicate somebody to come from wealth. This surname is found all over the United Kingdom but is highest in East Anglia, especially where there has been history of heavy Anglo Saxon Settlements.

There is also another town associated with this surname located in the United States called Utting, Arizona, which is named after Charles Utting who fought with the rough riders during the Spanish-American War.

Utting may refer to:

- Andrew Utting (born 1977), Australian baseball player
- Charlie Utting (1923–2009), Australian rules footballer
- Ern Utting (1897–1948), Australian rules footballer
- Michael Utting (born 1970), New Zealand soccer player

== See also ==
- Utting, Germany
- Lithuanian Jews
- Shinah Solomon Etting (1744-1822), innkeeper
- Solomon Etting (1764-1847), politician
