= Etting (surname) =

Etting is a surname. Notable people with the surname include:

- Brian R. Etting, American producer, director, and screenwriter
- Emlen Etting (1905–1993), American painter, sculptor, and filmmaker
- Gloria Braggiotti Etting (1909–2003), American dancer, newspaper columnist, photographer, and author
- Ruth Etting (1896–1978), American singer and actress
- Shinah Solomon Etting (1744–1822), American matriarch
- Solomon Etting (1764–1847), American merchant and politician
