= Maryland/Israel Development Center =

American non-profit organization

- Abbreviation: MIDC
- Formation: 1992; 34 years ago
- Type: 501(c)(3), charitable organization
- Tax ID no.: EIN 521777737
- Location(s): Baltimore World Trade Center; Baltimore, MD, U.S.
- Website: marylandisrael.org

The Maryland/Israel Development Center (MIDC) is a non-profit 501(c)(3) organization headquartered in Baltimore, Maryland, that promotes bilateral trade, investment, joint ventures, and economic development between Maryland and Israel.

It operates as a public-private partnership involving the Maryland Department of Commerce, Israel's Ministry of Economy and Industry (formerly Ministry of Economy and Trade), and The Associated: Jewish Federation of Baltimore.

== History ==
The organization was founded in 1992. It grew out of a pact between Maryland Governor William Donald Schaefer and Israel's U.S. ambassador to promote economic development. Early efforts included a sister-city program with Kiryat Gat through the Associated Jewish Community Federation of Baltimore.

Its mission focuses on creating jobs in both economies through trade promotion, business matchmaking, market entry support for Israeli companies in Maryland (and vice versa), and facilitating collaborations in sectors such as technology, life sciences, cybersecurity, and infrastructure.

It has organized trade missions, hosted events (including anniversaries and innovation dinners), and supported Israeli companies establishing operations in Maryland. Long-time Executive Director Barry Bogage served for about 30 years until his retirement around 2022; David K. Speer succeeded him as Executive Director.

== Activities and Services ==
MIDC provides services including:

- Assistance for Israeli companies entering the U.S. market (e.g., finding customers, distributors, office space).
- Support for Maryland/U.S. companies exporting to or partnering with Israel.
- Funding program facilitation (e.g., connections to BIRD Foundation grants).
- Networking events, webinars, and business development reports.

It has highlighted successes such as Israeli firms in Maryland (e.g., in Rockville, Hunt Valley, Pikesville, Silver Spring) in areas like accessibility tech (RightHear), AI/roadway intelligence (Rekor), and medical innovations.

== Governance and Funding ==
As of recent filings, key personnel have included Executive Director David Speer and Deputy Director Nancy Boguslaw. Board leadership has included Chair David Kuntz. It receives government grants/contributions (a significant portion of revenue) alongside membership and other support.

== Economic Impact ==
A 2026 MIDC-commissioned study (with Maryland Department of Commerce support) reported:

- $315.1 million total impact from Israeli investment in Maryland (2024).
- 987 jobs created.
- Maryland exports to Israel: $87 million (up 22.5% since 2020).
- Imports from Israel: $171 million (up 55.5% since 2020).

Notable assisted companies include ELTA North America, Nayax, Medispec, RADA, RightHear, Rekor, GaitBetter, and others.

== Controversies ==
MIDC has faced criticism and calls from activist groups (e.g., via dropthemidc.org and coalitions involving Peace Action Montgomery) to end public funding, citing its facilitation of Israeli companies—including some in defense or dual-use sectors—into Maryland and alleged ties to military-related activities. Proponents emphasize its role in general economic development, job creation, and non-military innovation.

== Also see ==
- Maryland Anti-BDS Law
