= Mendes Cohen =

Jewish American politician, soldier, traveler and businessman

Mendes Israel Cohen
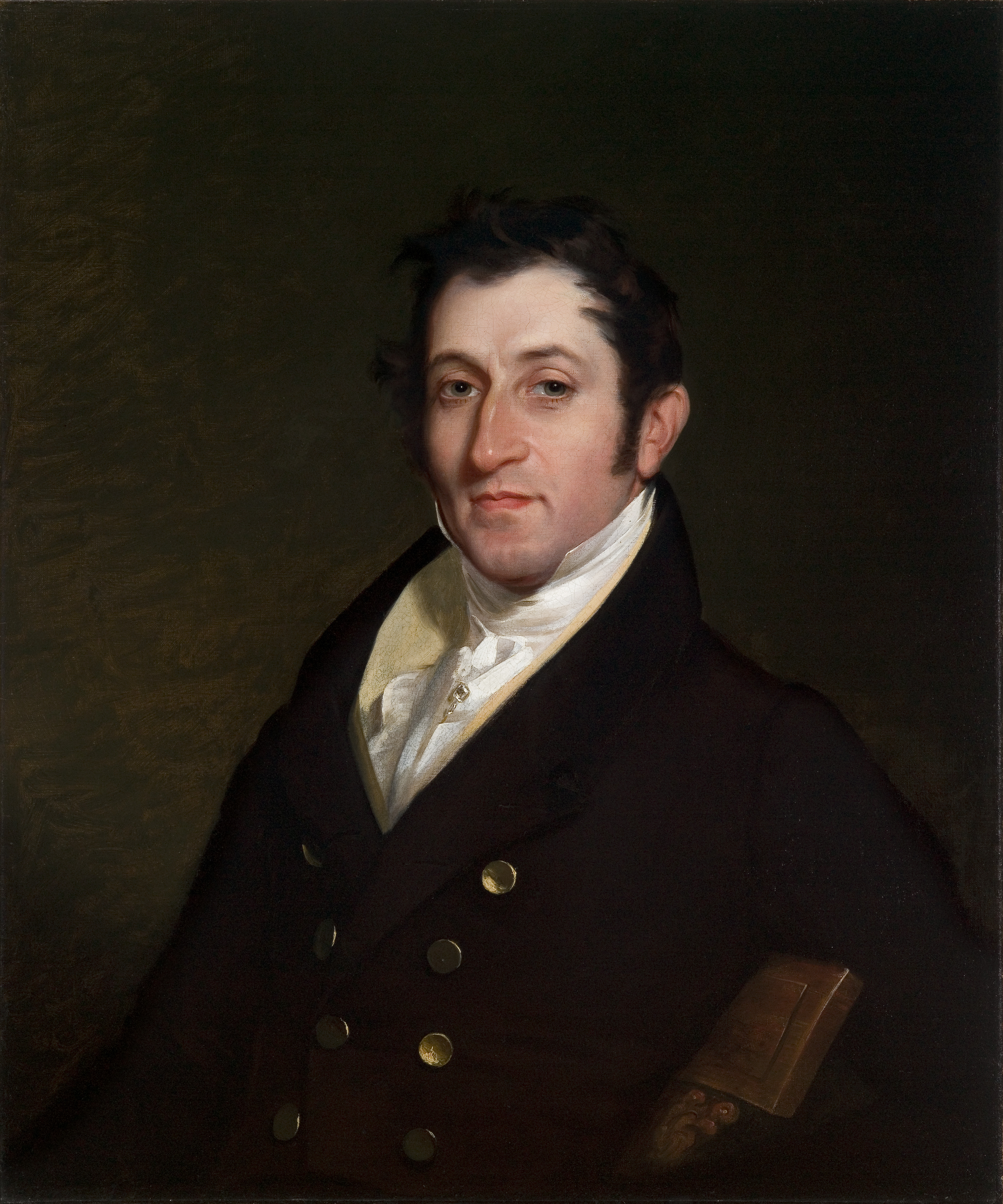
- Portrait by Rembrandt Peale, c. 1838
- Born: Richmond, Virginia
- Died: May 7, 1879 (aged 82)

Mendes Israel Cohen (1796–1879) was a Jewish American politician, soldier, traveler and businessman who lived in Baltimore, Maryland.

== Early life ==
Cohen was born in Richmond, Virginia, in 1796, one of nine children of Israel I. Cohen and Judith Solomon Cohen. The family moved to Baltimore, Maryland, in 1803. As a young man he worked in the family businesses: Cohen's Lottery and Exchange, and Jacob I. Cohen, Jr. and Brothers Banking House. The Cohens' lottery raised money to help finance construction of Baltimore’s Washington Monument in Mount Vernon. In 1821, they and their lottery were the subject of a Supreme Court lawsuit Cohens v. Virginia, asserting the federal government’s right to review and overturn state Supreme Court decisions.

== Military service ==
In the War of 1812, Cohen and his brothers Philip and Jacob joined a volunteer company charged with defending Baltimore–Nicholson’s Artillery Fencibles—serving under Captain Joseph H. Nicholson. He participated in the Battle of Baltimore.

== World travel ==
In 1829, Cohen retired from the family business a wealthy man and traveled the world collecting artifacts. He visited England, Russia, Turkey, Jerusalem, Egypt, and most of the countries in Central and Western Europe. He was said to be the first American to tour the Nile Valley. He was a prolific writer of letters, which often contained his itinerary and appointments. Cohen attended the coronation of William IV in June 1830 and the funeral of King George IV in August 1830. He met Pope Gregory XVI on January 29, 1831. He represented Maryland at the coronation of Queen Victoria in 1838. He was the first American citizen who received permission from the Ottoman Empire to visit Jerusalem and he wrote about the hardships of the Jews of Jerusalem.

== Public service ==
Cohen returned to the United States and became a public servant, first as an aide to the Maryland governor, Thomas Veazey. Veazey gave Mendes the ceremonial title "Colonel" in recognition of his service in the Battle of Baltimore. He was elected to the House of Delegates from Baltimore City in 1847 and served a single term. He was the first Jewish member of the Maryland General Assembly and serves as a trustee to the Baltimore and Ohio Railroad. He was also on the board of the Hebrew Benevolent Society in 1858 when they launched plans for the Hebrew Hospital of Baltimore, now known as Sinai Hospital.

== Legacy ==
Cohen was a lifelong bachelor and died without heirs. His collections from his travels were donated in 1884 by his namesake nephew to Johns Hopkins University, where they became the Cohen collection of Egyptian antiquities. His portrait was painted by Joseph Wood (1818) and Rembrandt Peale (1838). The Jewish Museum of Maryland created an exhibit about his life in 2015.
