= Bartle v. Coleman =

- Supreme Court of the United States

Decided March 10, 1821
- Full case name: Bartle v. Coleman
- Citations: 19 U.S. 475 (more) 6 Wheat. 475; 5 L. Ed. 309; 1821 U.S. LEXIS 367

Court membership
- Chief Justice John Marshall Associate Justices Bushrod Washington · William Johnson; H. Brockholst Livingston · Thomas Todd; Gabriel Duvall · Joseph Story

Case opinion
- Majority: Marshall

Bartle v. Coleman, 19 U.S. (6 Wheat.) 475 (1821), was a United States Supreme Court case.

== Background ==
Andrew Bartle, George Coleman, and Ferdinand Marsteller had entered into a contract with the United States government to rebuild a location called Fort Washington, possibly meaning Fort Washington (Maryland) which was captured by the British in the War of 1812.

Arbitrators had rules that Bartle should pay Coleman.

== Opinion ==
The Supreme Court reversed the judgement.

== See also ==
- List of United States Supreme Court cases, volume 19
