= John Wesley Jarvis =

American painter (1780–1839)

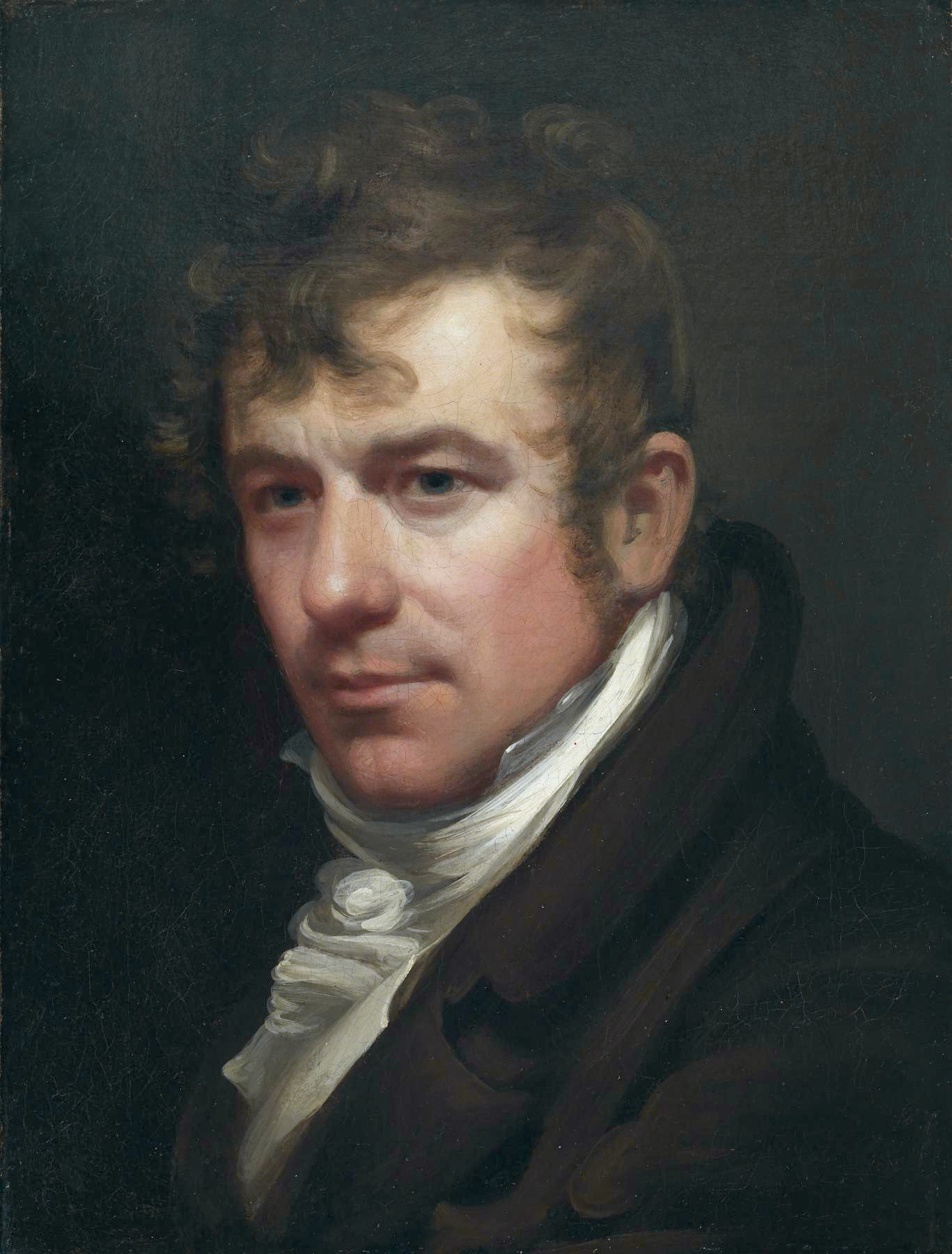
- Self-portrait, c. 1812
- Born: 1780/1781; South Shields, England
- Died: 1839 (aged 57–59); New York City, U.S.
- Known for: Painting

John Wesley Jarvis (1780 or 1781 – January 14, 1839) was an American painter.

== Early life and education ==
Jarvis was the great, great nephew of Methodist leader John Wesley, and was born in South Shields, England in 1780 or 1781. His father was an English mariner, who moved his family to the United States in the mid-1780s. The Jarvis family settled in Philadelphia where Jarvis spent his childhood and began his artistic training. He is known to have frequented the studio of the aging colonial-era portrait painter Matthew Pratt, and he knew the Danish painter Christian Gullager. His formal instruction began around 1796, when he became an apprentice to Edward Savage. He also spent time with David Edwin, an English engraver also employed by Savage.

== Career ==
Jarvis moved to New York City in 1801 with Edward Savage. Within a year, he was working on his own as an engraver. In 1803, he entered into a partnership with Joseph Wood, which lasted seven years. Together, they executed engravings, miniatures, and larger portraits. Jarvis learned the technique of miniature painting from Edward Malbone. By the time he entered the partnership with Wood, he was producing his first oil paintings, operating a drawing school, and developing inexpensive silhouette portraits.

In New York City, Jarvis enjoyed great popularity, though his eccentric mode of life impacts his work. He visited Baltimore, Charleston, and New Orleans, where he entertained and painted portraits of prominent people. In New Orleans, then General Andrew Jackson sat for a portrait painted by Jarvis. He had assistants, including Thomas Sully and Henry Inman. He affected singularity in dress and manners.

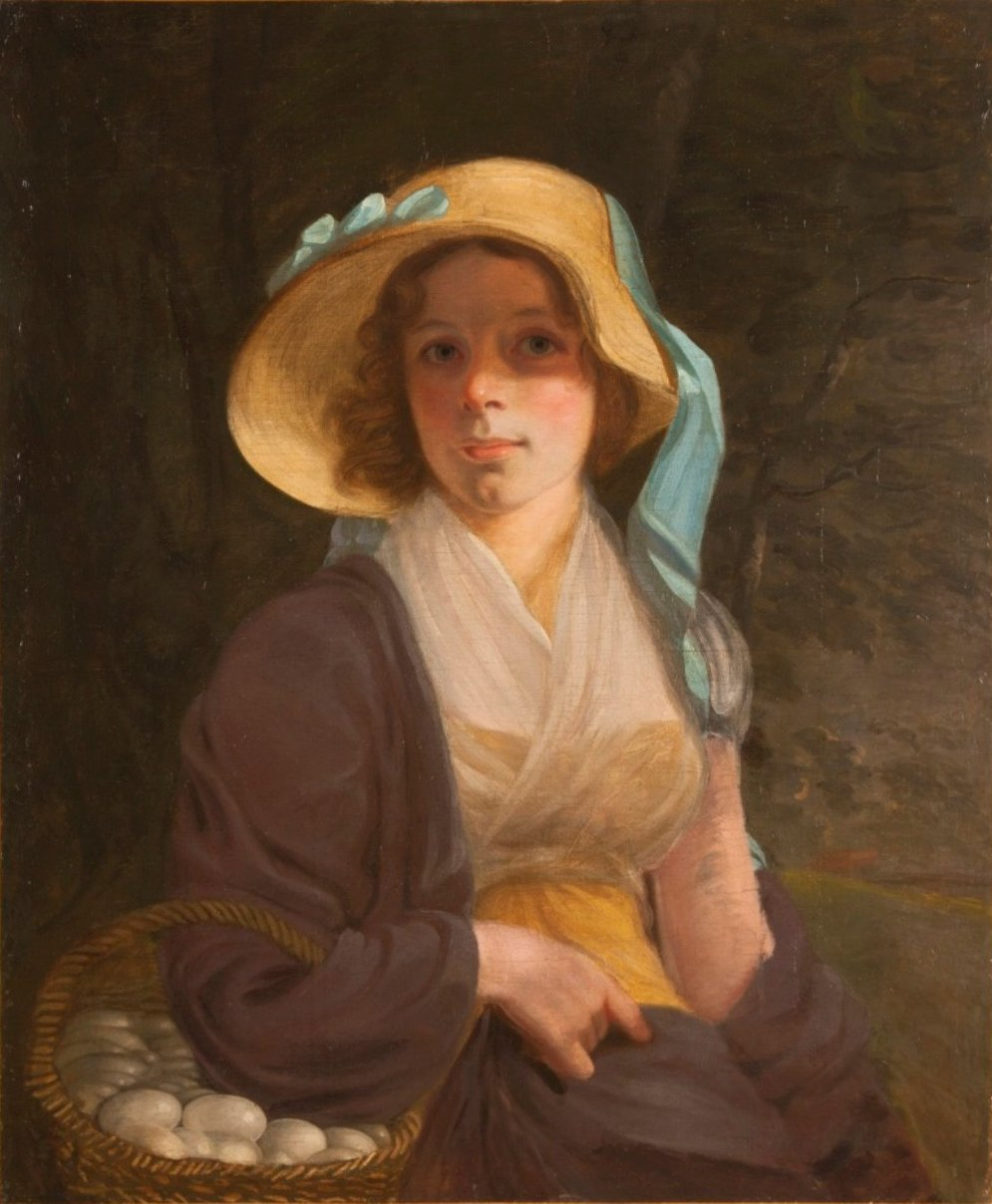
Portrait of Betsy Burtis

In 1809, Jarvis married Betsy Burtis; she died four years later, in 1813. They had two children together. He parted with his family in order to seek portrait commissions in Baltimore. Although he made occasional trips back to his home base in New York City, he remained in Baltimore for several years. He maintained extended residences in other cities for most of the rest of his life.

During the 1820s and 1830s, while maintaining his residence in New York City, he worked in South Carolina, Kentucky, Louisiana, Massachusetts, Washington, Virginia, Ohio, and Georgia. His apprentice, Henry Inman, probably accompanied him on these trips until his term of service ended in 1822.

Jarvis rose to the top of his profession by 1814, when he took over an unprecedented commission for six full-length portraits of the naval heroes of the War of 1812 for the City of New York; Gilbert Stuart gave up the important project after a dispute with the patrons.

For over a decade, he remained the premier portrait painter in New York City, where he established important ties to the political, mercantile, and cultural elite. Jarvis maintained the status of a social outsider known for his ostentatious dress, flippant manner, and consumption of alcohol. He was celebrated as a hilarious storyteller, and his ties to the theater world were extensive.

In the 1820s, he experienced some personal setbacks. In 1823, he was sued successfully by his apprentice John Quidor for breach of contract. The following year, in 1824, he lost custody of his children in a court battle with his estranged second wife.

== Death ==
A decade later, in 1834, Jarvis suffered a debilitating stroke while in New Orleans. Partially paralyzed and mentally incapacitated, he spent the rest of his life in New York City, where he was cared for by his sister. In 1839, largely impoverished, he died in New York City.

== Legacy ==
Examples of his painting are in the collections of the New York Historical Society, and the Metropolitan Museum of Art.

== Gallery ==
William Linn, c. 1805

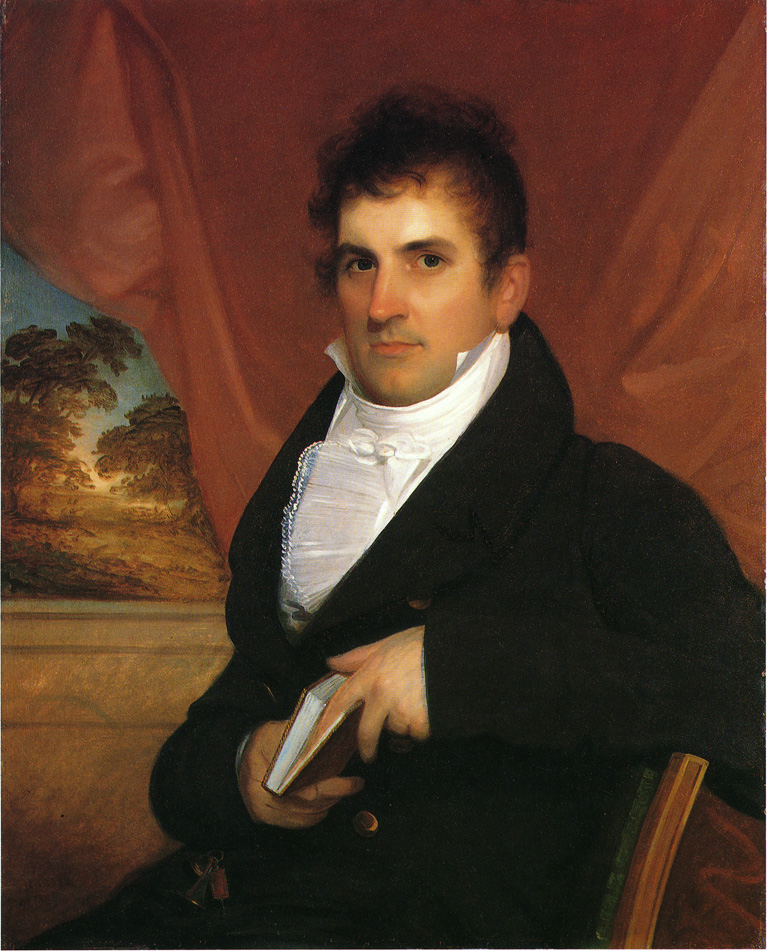
Philip Hone, c. 1809

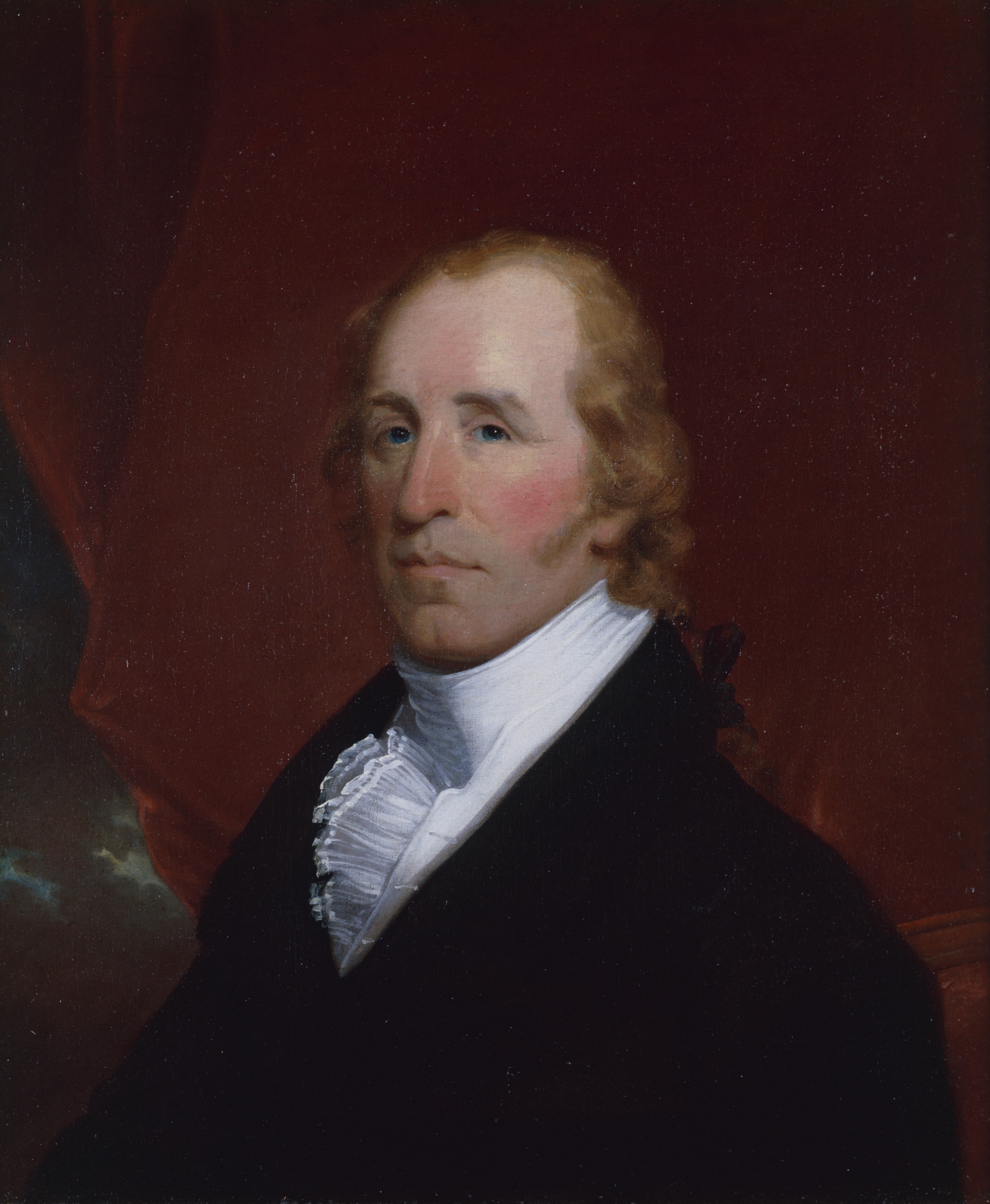
William Clark, c. 1810

John Randolph, c. 1811

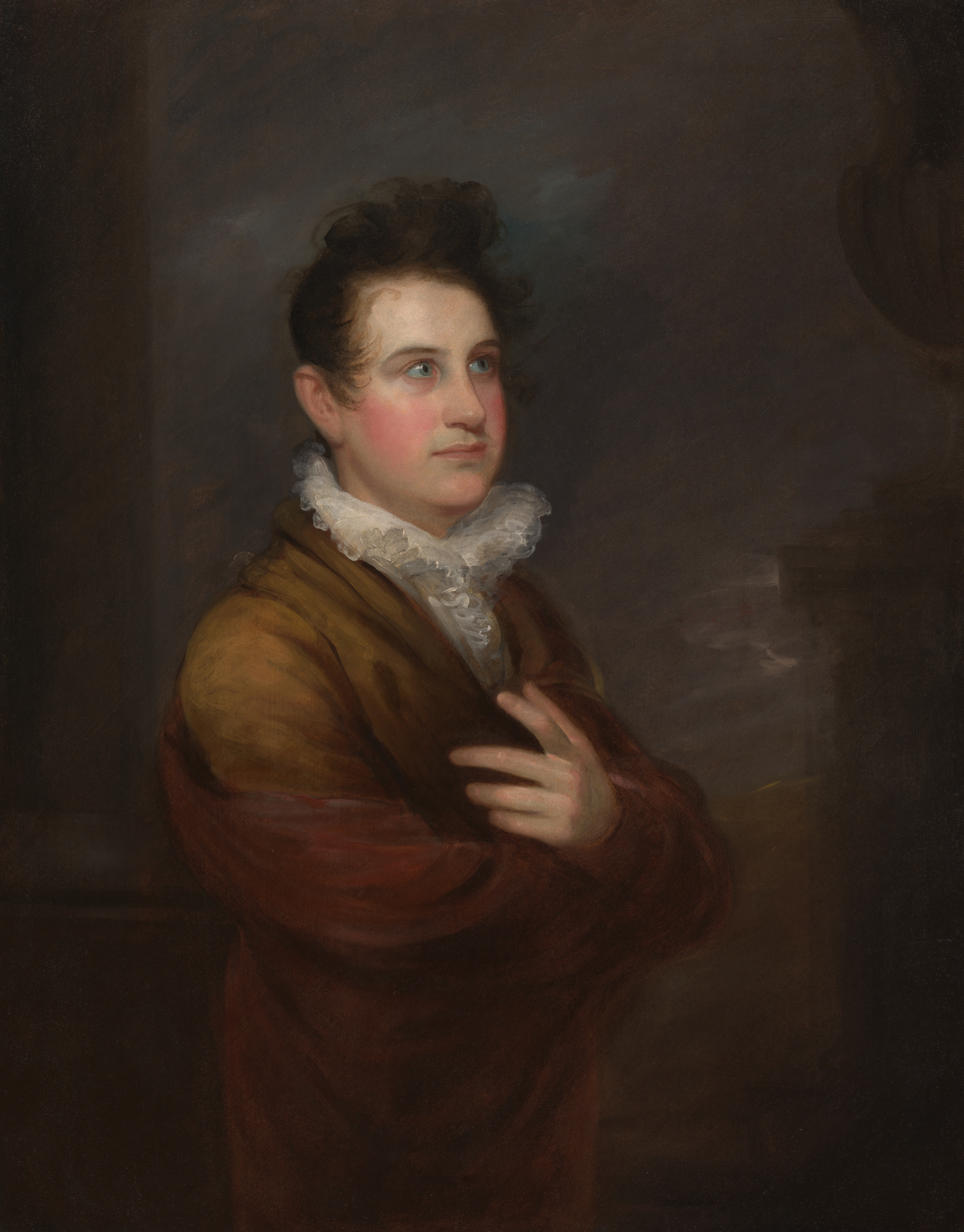
John Howard Payne, c. 1812

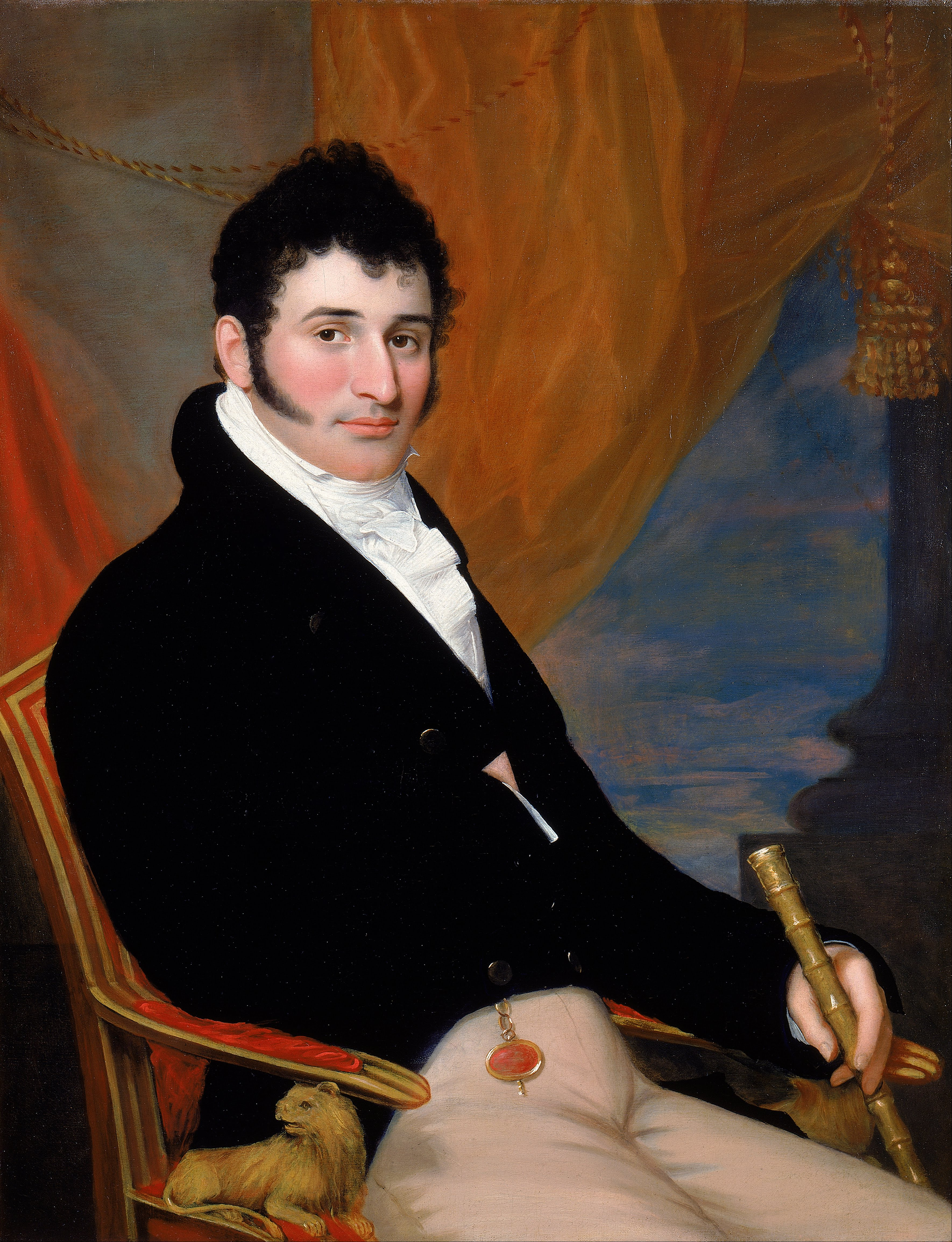
Solomon Isaacs, c. 1813

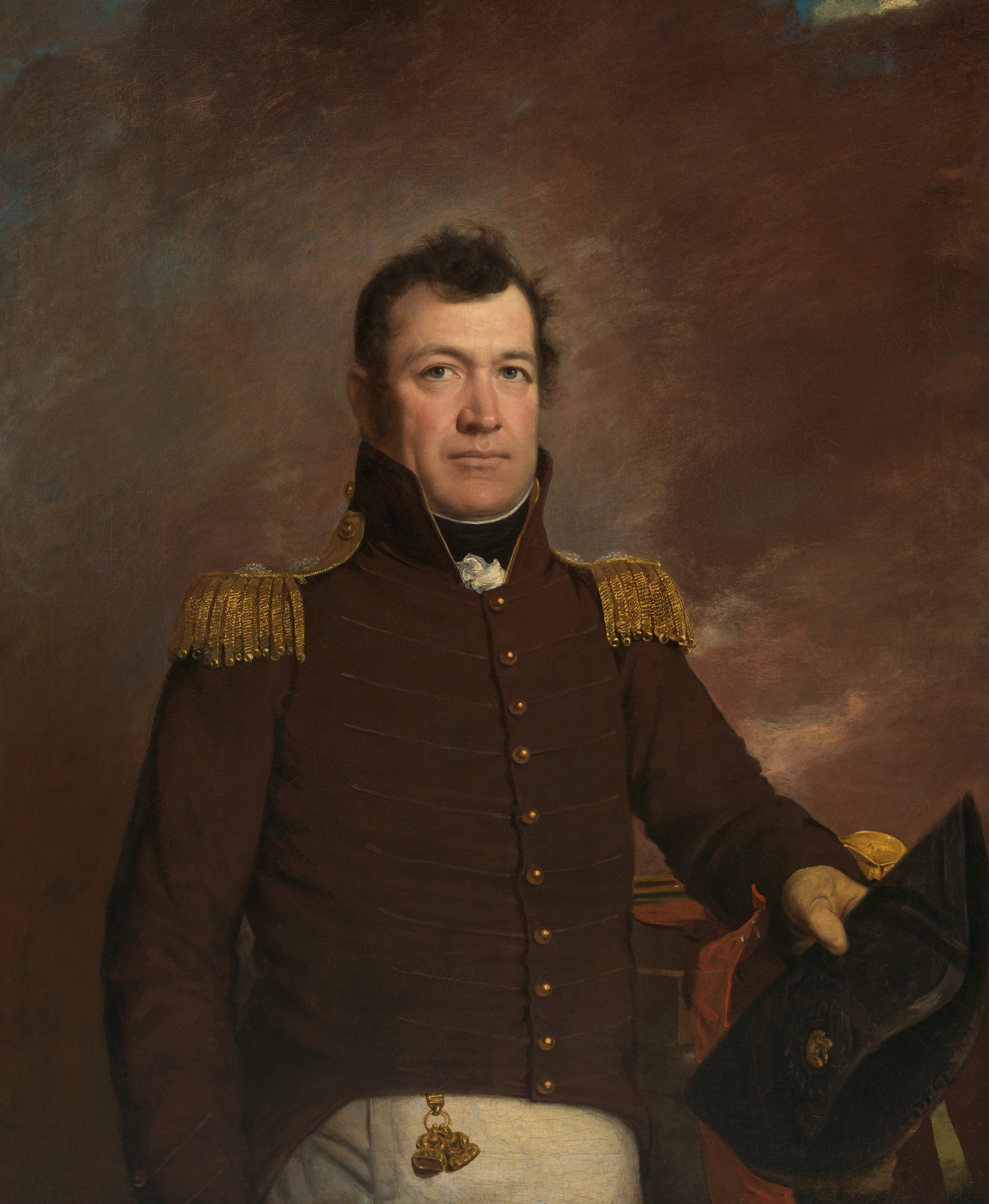
Jacob Jennings Brown, c. 1815

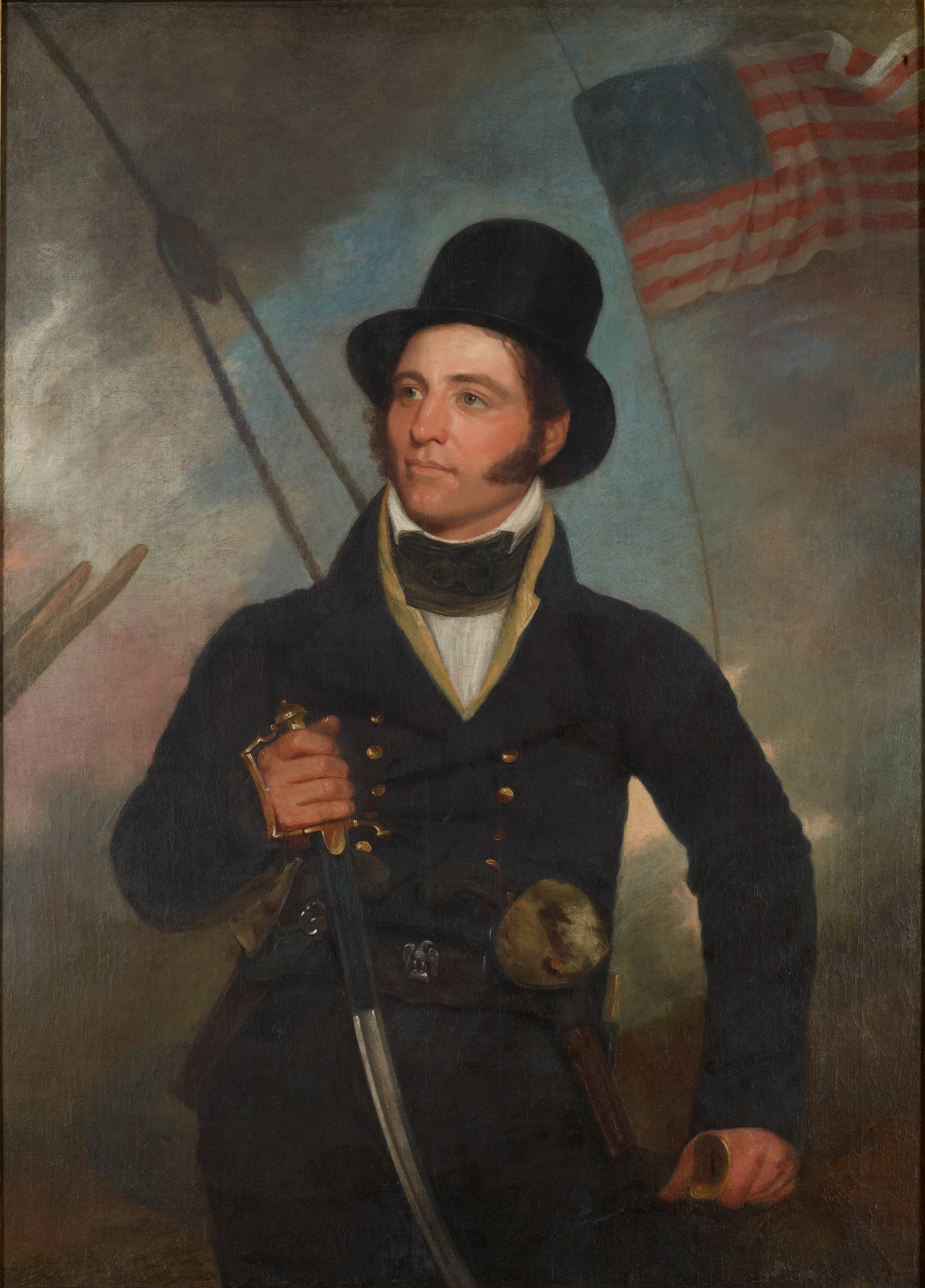
Samuel Chester Reid, c. 1815

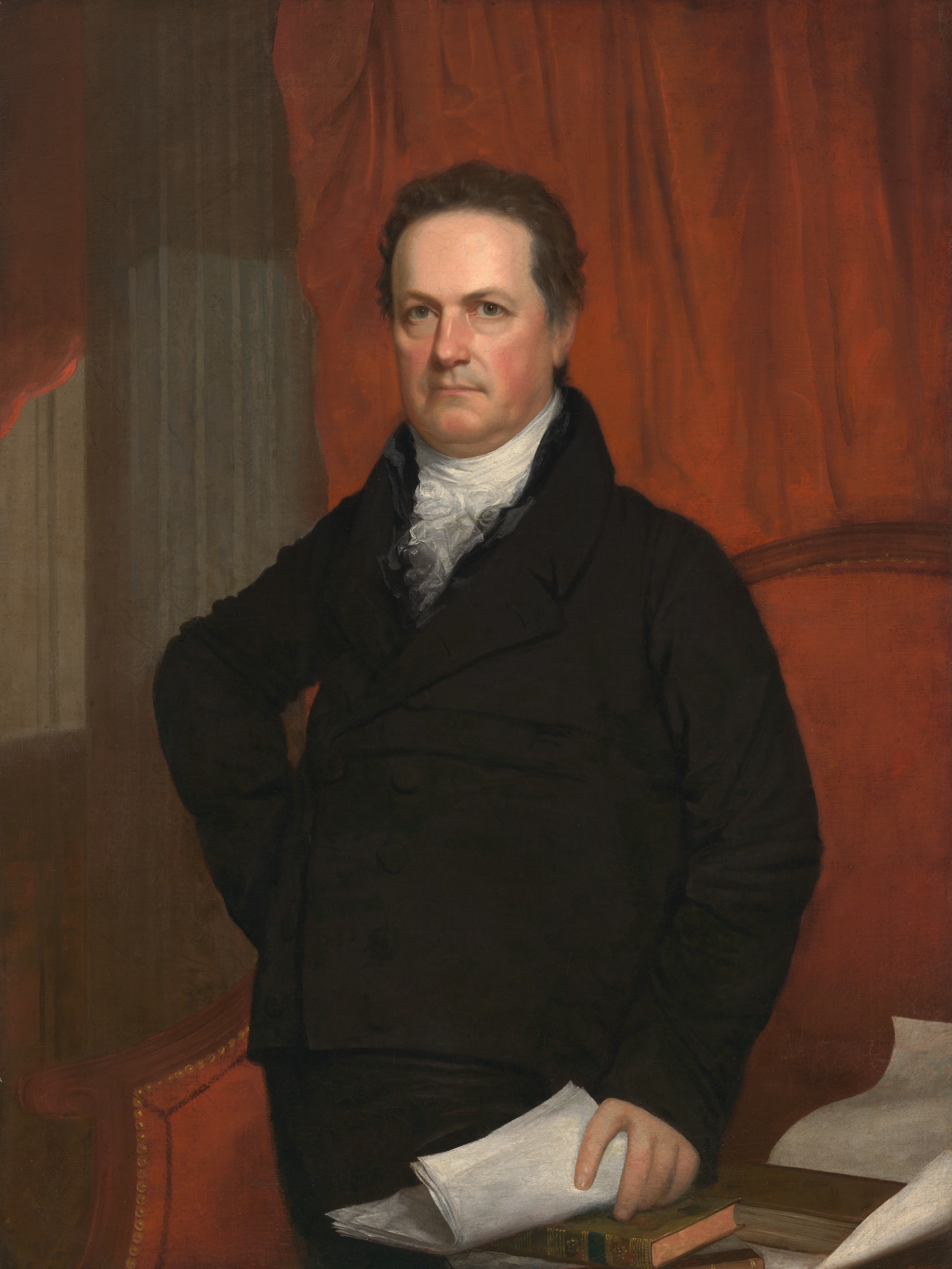
DeWitt Clinton, c. 1816

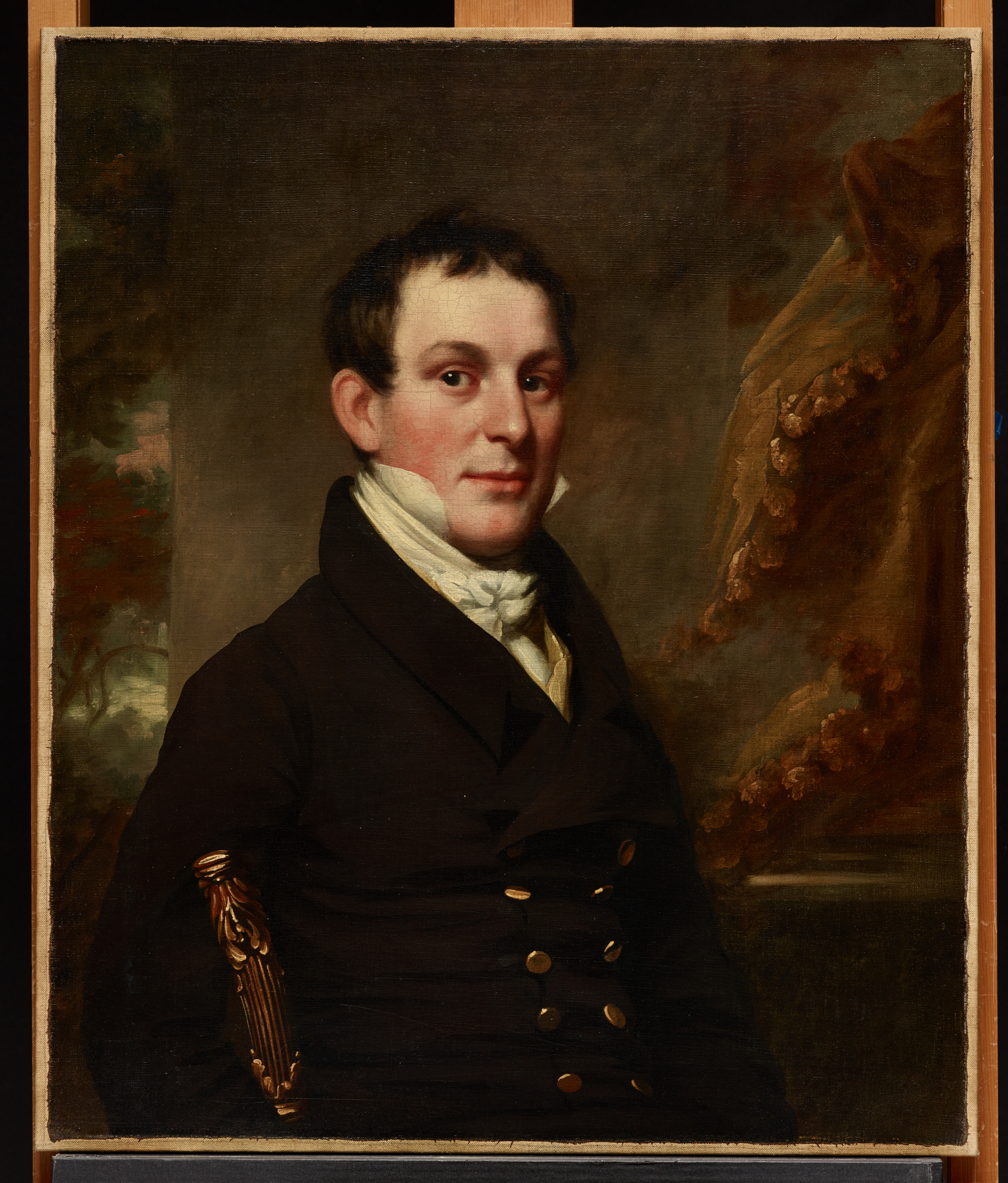
Portrait of a man, c. 1815-20, in the Dallas Museum of Art

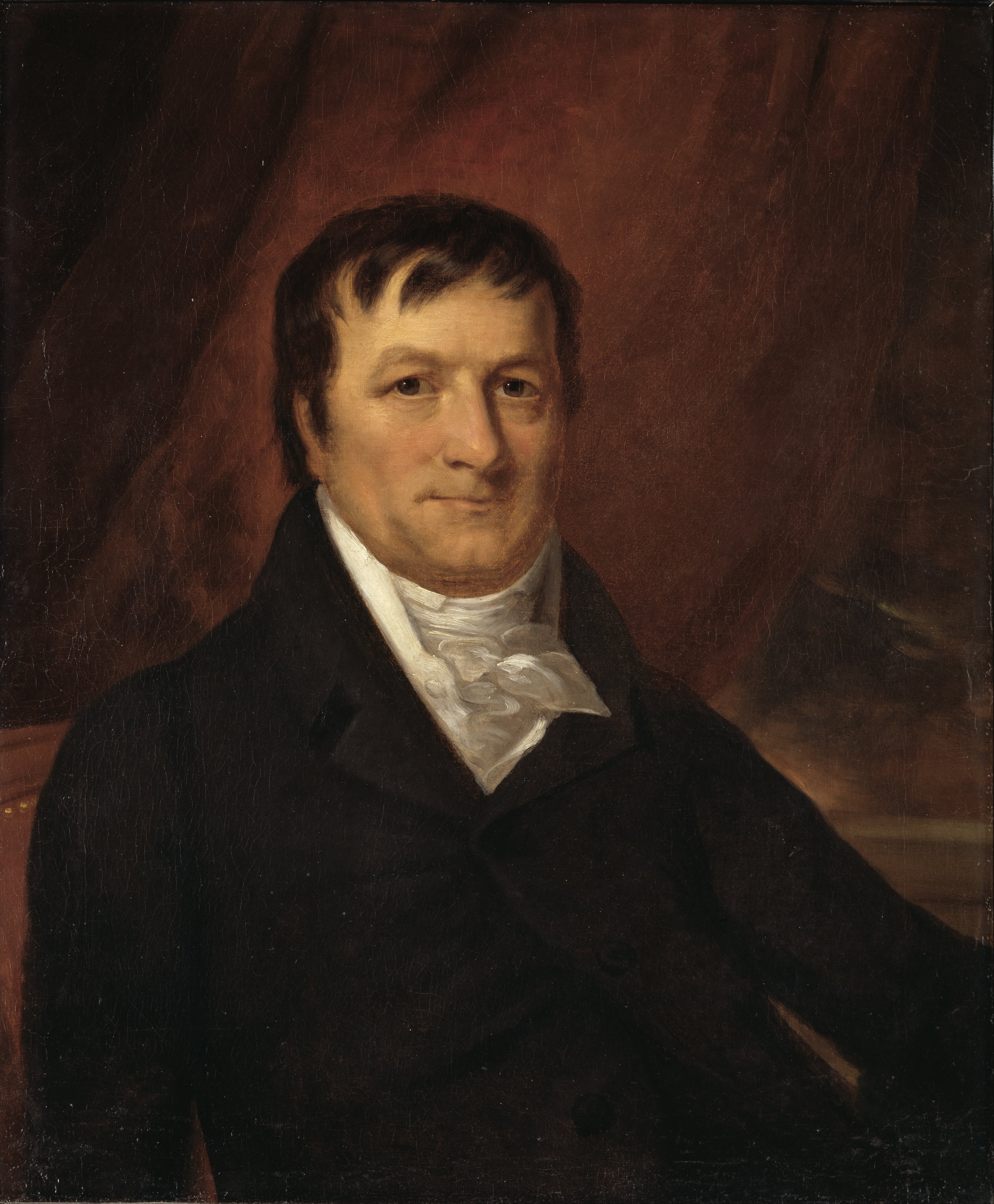
John Jacob Astor, c. 1825

Stephen Van Rensselaer, c. 1825–1835

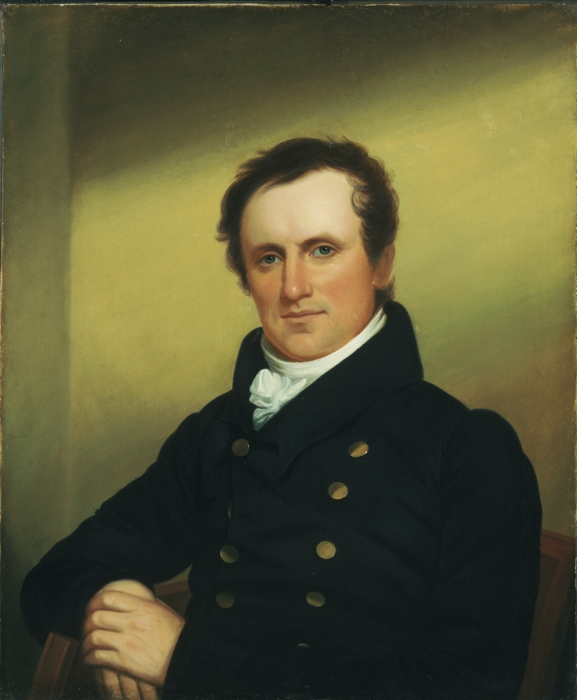
James Fenimore Cooper, c. 1830
