= Jacob I. Cohen Jr. =

American politician

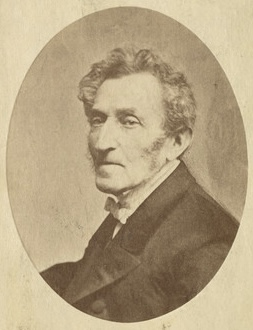

Jacob I. Cohen Jr. (born September 30, 1789, in Richmond, Virginia; died April 6, 1869, in Baltimore, Maryland) was an American banker, railroad executive, and civic leader in Baltimore who helped secure the right for Jews to hold public office in Maryland.

== Biography ==
Sources differ on some details of his early life. The 1912 History of the Jews in America says his father was "Jacob J. Cohen", who emigrated from Rhenish Prussia to the American colonies in 1773, fought in the Revolutionary War, and died in 1808. The Maryland State Archives gives his father's name as "Israel I. Cohen", who died in 1803. The 1901 Jewish Encyclopedia says that Jacob J. Cohen was the older brother of Israel, who followed him from Oberdorf, near Nördlingen, Bavaria, to Richmond in 1787. There Israel married and became the father of Jacob I. Cohen Jr.

All agree that after the elder Cohen died, his widow, Judith Solomon Cohen (1766–1837), moved her six surviving children, all sons, from Richmond to Baltimore. There the sons established a family business that grew to wield sizeable economic and political influence. Jacob and at least one of his brothers served with distinction in the defense of the city during the War of 1812.

Cohen and his brothers founded Cohen's Lottery and Exchange Office in 1812, which became one of Baltimore's foremost lottery brokers, with branches in several other East Coast cities. Cohen brought all five of his brothers into business with him. His brothers Philip and Mendes were in charge of their Norfolk office, where they were arrested on charges of selling National Lottery tickets (for the District of Columbia) in Virginia after the state had passed a law against the sale of such out-of-state lottery tickets. The two men were convicted, but the case eventually reached the U.S. Supreme Court. In Cohens v. Virginia, the Court affirmed its jurisdiction over such state cases.

He became the first homeowner in Baltimore to use natural gas to light his private residence in 1820, which was on North Charles Street.

In the early 1820s, Cohen and Solomon Etting (1764–1847) led the fight for the "Jew Bill." When this was passed in 1825 by Maryland's General Assembly, it altered the state's Test Act to allow Jews to hold public office upon swearing to a belief in "the doctrine of reward and punishment", rather than the generally required declaration of belief in Christianity. After the bill was passed, Cohen and Etting both ran successfully for Baltimore City Council in 1826, becoming the first Jews to hold elected office in Maryland. In 1830, Cohen helped establish the Baltimore City Board of School Commissioners. He also served as its secretary and treasurer for eight years. He also a member of the Baltimore City Commissioners of Finance.

Also in 1830, Cohen and his brothers established J. I. Cohen Jr. & Brothers' Banking House. It was one of the few banks to survive the Panic of 1837.

In the mid-1830s, Cohen became a director of the Baltimore and Port Deposit Railroad (B&PD), on October 12, 1835, and of the Wilmington and Susquehanna Railroad, two companies chartered by the state of Maryland to build a railroad that would link Baltimore with cities to the northeast.

On January 22, 1838, Cohen succeeded Lewis Brantz as president of the B&PD after Brantz's sudden death. Within months, both railroads merged into the Philadelphia, Wilmington and Baltimore Railroad (PW&B), which thenceforth operated the first rail link from Philadelphia to Baltimore. (This main line survives today as part of Amtrak's Northeast Corridor.)

Cohen became a vice-president of the PW&B on February 20, 1838. He resigned the position on January 1, 1842, to reduce company expenses. Later in the month he took a position on the southernmost of three new executive committees set up to manage the railroad. Cohen's service as a railroad executive is noted on the 1839 Newkirk Viaduct Monument in Philadelphia.

Cohen never married and had no known children. He died in Baltimore on April 6, 1869.
