= Thomas Kennedy (Maryland politician) =

American politician from Maryland (1776–1832)

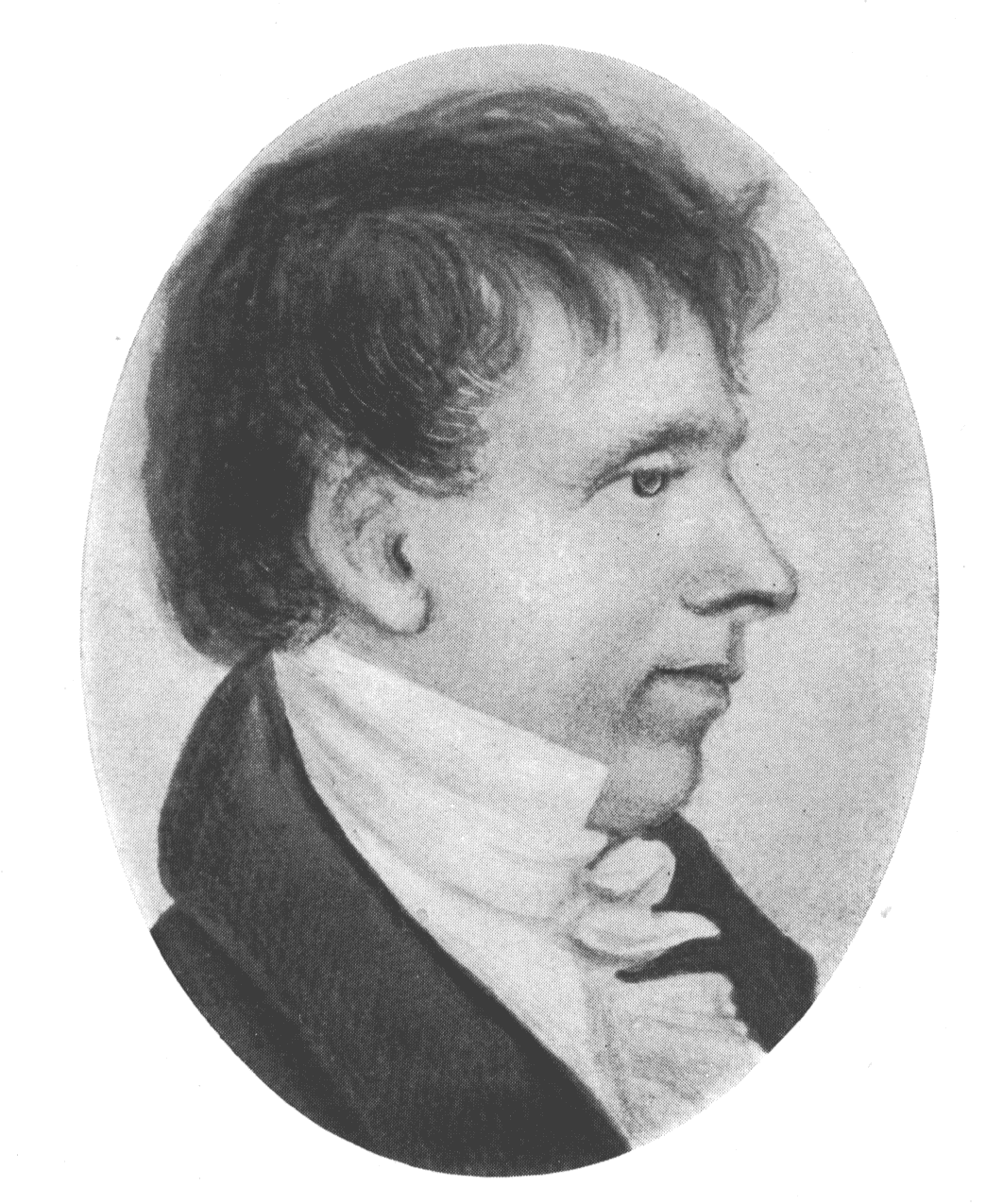

Member of the Maryland House of Delegates and Maryland Senate

Personal details
- Born: 1776
- Died: 1832 (aged 55–56) Hagerstown, Maryland

Thomas Kennedy (1776–1832) was a member of the Maryland House of Delegates and Maryland Senate. He was the leading force behind the passage of the so-called "Jew Bill," which allowed Jews to hold public office in Maryland.

Maryland's constitution had been adopted in 1776, and it required all public officeholders to make "a declaration of a belief in the Christian religion." Kennedy led the fight to remove this discriminatory requirement. His measure was voted down several times between 1818 and 1826, by which time he himself had been elected to the Maryland legislature.

Arguing on behalf of the change, Kennedy said, "There are few Jews in the United States. In Maryland there are very few. But if there was only one — to that one, we ought to do justice."

In 1918, the Independent Order of B'rith Sholom erected a granite obelisk for Kennedy at Rose Hill Cemetery in Hagerstown, Maryland. In 1992, a plaque was installed at the Maryland State House honoring Kennedy. In 1995, the Maryland House of Delegates created a Thomas Kennedy Award, given annually to a former member of the house for personal courage and dedication to the principles of liberty and freedom. In 2018, Hagerstown broke ground on a Thomas Kennedy Park, with plans for a statue and a permanent Thomas Kennedy Center.
