= List of United States Supreme Court cases, volume 19 =

Supreme Court of the United States
- Interactive map of Supreme Court of the United States
- 38°53′26″N 77°00′16″W
- Established: March 4, 1789; 237 years ago
- Location: Washington, D.C.
- Coordinates: 38°53′26″N 77°00′16″W
- Composition method: Presidential nomination with Senate confirmation
- Authorised by: Constitution of the United States, Art. III, § 1
- Judge term length: life tenure, subject to impeachment and removal
- Number of positions: 9 (by statute)
- Website: supremecourt.gov

This is a list of cases reported in volume 19 (6 Wheat.) of United States Reports, decided by the Supreme Court of the United States in 1821.

== Nominative reports ==
In 1874, the U.S. government created the United States Reports, and retroactively numbered older privately published case reports as part of the new series. As a result, cases appearing in volumes 1–90 of U.S. Reports have dual citation forms; one for the volume number of U.S. Reports, and one for the volume number of the reports named for the relevant reporter of decisions (these are called "nominative reports").

=== Henry Wheaton ===
Starting with the 14th volume of U.S. Reports, the Reporter of Decisions of the Supreme Court of the United States was Henry Wheaton. Wheaton was Reporter of Decisions from 1816 to 1827, covering volumes 14 through 25 of United States Reports which correspond to volumes 1 through 12 of his Wheaton's Reports. As such, the dual form of citation to, for example, Hopkins v. Lee is 19 U.S. (6 Wheat.) 109 (1821).

== Justices of the Supreme Court at the time of 19 U.S. (6 Wheat.) ==
The Supreme Court is established by Article III, Section 1 of the Constitution of the United States, which says: "The judicial Power of the United States, shall be vested in one supreme Court . . .". The size of the Court is not specified; the Constitution leaves it to Congress to set the number of justices. Under the Judiciary Act of 1789 Congress originally fixed the number of justices at six (one chief justice and five associate justices). Since 1789 Congress has varied the size of the Court from six to seven, nine, ten, and back to nine justices (always including one chief justice).

When the cases in 19 U.S. (6 Wheat.) were decided, the Court comprised these seven justices:

Portrait	Justice	Office	Home State	Succeeded	Date confirmed by the Senate (Vote)	Tenure on Supreme Court
	John Marshall	Chief Justice	Virginia	Oliver Ellsworth	January 27, 1801 (Acclamation)	February 4, 1801 – July 6, 1835 (Died)
	Bushrod Washington	Associate Justice	Virginia	James Wilson	December 20, 1798 (Acclamation)	November 9, 1798 (Recess Appointment) – November 26, 1829 (Died)
	William Johnson	Associate Justice	South Carolina	Alfred Moore	March 24, 1804 (Acclamation)	May 7, 1804 – August 4, 1834 (Died)
	Henry Brockholst Livingston	Associate Justice	New York	William Paterson	December 17, 1806 (Acclamation)	January 20, 1807 – March 18, 1823 (Died)
	Thomas Todd	Associate Justice	Kentucky	new seat	March 2, 1807 (Acclamation)	March 3, 1807 – February 7, 1826 (Died)
	Gabriel Duvall	Associate Justice	Maryland	Samuel Chase	November 18, 1811 (Acclamation)	November 23, 1811 – January 12, 1835 (Resigned)
	Joseph Story	Associate Justice	Massachusetts	William Cushing	November 18, 1811 (Acclamation)	February 3, 1812 – September 10, 1845 (Died)

== Notable Case in 19 U.S. (6 Wheat.) ==
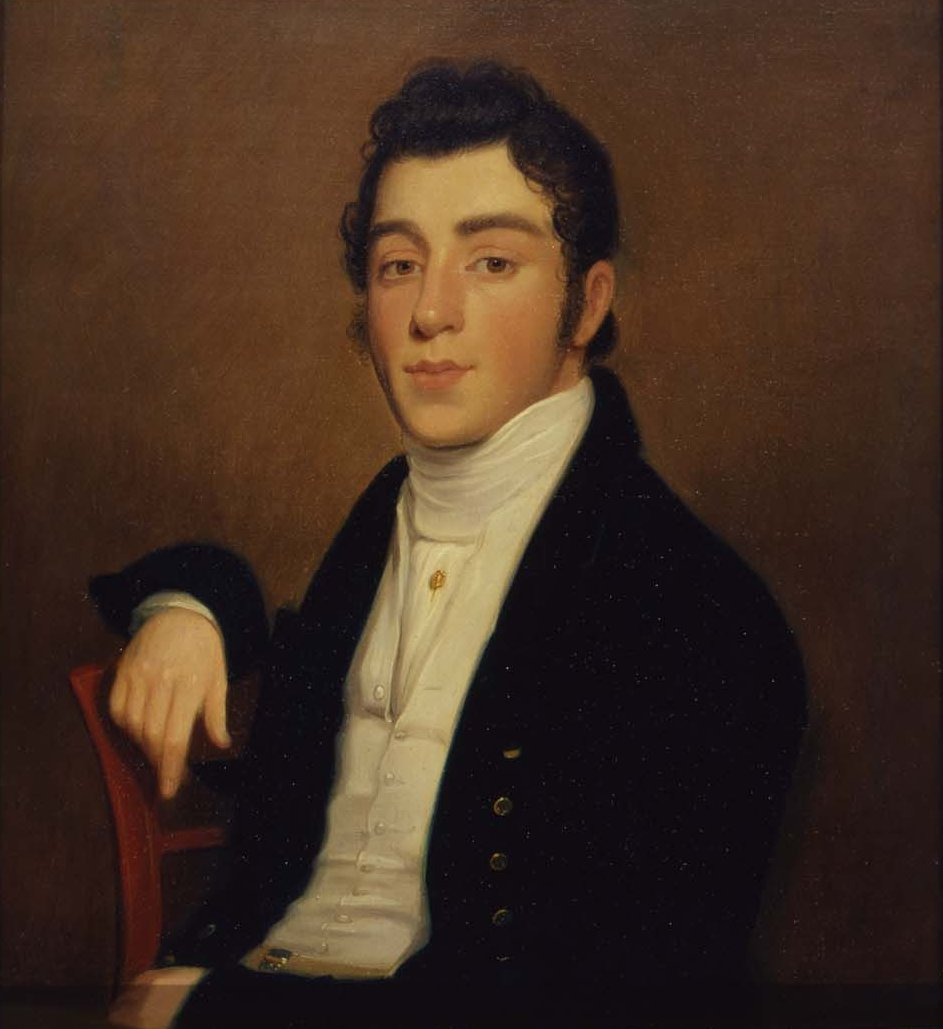
1818 portrait of Mendes J. Cohen by Joseph Wood.

=== Cohens v. Virginia ===
Cohens v. Virginia, 19 U.S. (6 Wheat.) 264 (1821), is a landmark case by the Supreme Court of the United States that is most notable for the Court's assertion of its power to review state supreme court decisions in criminal law matters when the defendant claims that their constitutional rights have been violated. The Court had previously asserted a similar jurisdiction over civil cases involving U.S. parties. The main issue in the case was the preliminary issue of whether the Supreme Court had jurisdiction to hear an appeal in a criminal case decided by the courts of Virginia. Virginia argued that the U.S. Constitution does not give the Supreme Court appellate jurisdiction over criminal judgments by state courts. Virginia also argued that the U.S. Constitution does not give the Supreme Court appellate jurisdiction over cases in which a state is a party. In effect, Virginia argued that its decision was final and could not be reviewed by the federal courts even though the decision involved the interpretation and application of an act of Congress. The Supreme Court ruled, however, that unless state court decisions involving federal law could be reviewed by federal courts, there would be as many interpretations of federal law as there are states.

== Citation style ==
Under the Judiciary Act of 1789 the federal court structure at the time comprised District Courts, which had general trial jurisdiction; Circuit Courts, which had mixed trial and appellate (from the US District Courts) jurisdiction; and the United States Supreme Court, which had appellate jurisdiction over the federal District and Circuit courts—and for certain issues over state courts. The Supreme Court also had limited original jurisdiction (i.e., in which cases could be filed directly with the Supreme Court without first having been heard by a lower federal or state court). There were one or more federal District Courts and/or Circuit Courts in each state, territory, or other geographical region.

Bluebook citation style is used for case names, citations, and jurisdictions.

- ”C.C.D.” = United States Circuit Court for the District of . . .
  - e.g.,”C.C.D.N.J.” = United States Circuit Court for the District of New Jersey
- ”D.” = United States District Court for the District of . . .
  - e.g.,”D. Mass.” = United States District Court for the District of Massachusetts
- ”E.” = Eastern; ”M.” = Middle; ”N.” = Northern; ”S.” = Southern; ”W.” = Western
  - e.g.,”C.C.S.D.N.Y.” = United States Circuit Court for the Southern District of New York
  - e.g.,”M.D. Ala.” = United States District Court for the Middle District of Alabama
- ”Ct. Cl.” = United States Court of Claims
- The abbreviation of a state's name alone indicates the highest appellate court in that state's judiciary at the time.
  - e.g.,”Pa.” = Supreme Court of Pennsylvania
  - e.g.,”Me.” = Supreme Judicial Court of Maine

== List of cases in 19 U.S. (6 Wheat.) ==
Case Name	Page and year	Opinion of the Court	Concurring opinion(s)	Dissenting opinion(s)	Lower Court	Disposition
The Amiable Isabella	1 (1821)	Story	Johnson	none	C.C.D.N.C.	affirmed
Bussard v. Levering	102 (1821)	per curiam	none	none	C.C.D.C.	affirmed
Lindenberger v. Beall	104 (1821)	per curiam	none	none	C.C.D.C.	reversed
Mechanics' Bank v. Withers	106 (1821)	Marshall	none	none	C.C.D.C.	affirmed
Hopkins v. Lee	109 (1821)	Livingston	none	none	C.C.D.C.	affirmed
Thatcher v. Powell	119 (1821)	Marshall	none	none	C.C.D.W. Tenn.	affirmed
Randolph v. Barbour	128 (1821)	per curiam	none	none	C.C.D. Ky.	dismissed
Mayhew v. Thatcher	129 (1821)	Marshall	none	none	D. La.	affirmed
Farmers' and Mechanics' Bank of Pennsylvania v. Smith	131 (1821)	Marshall	none	none	Pa.	reversed
United States v. Wilkins	135 (1821)	Story	none	none	C.C.D. Ky.	certification
Young v. Bryan	146 (1821)	Marshall	none	none	C.C.D. Tenn.	affirmed
The Bello Corrunes	152 (1821)	Johnson	none	none	C.C.D.R.I.	multiple
Smith v. Universal Insurance Company	176 (1821)	Story	none	none	C.C.D. Md	affirmed
The Robert Edwards	187 (1821)	Livingston	none	none	C.C.D.S.C.	affirmed
The Nueva Anna	193 (1821)	per curiam	none	none	D. La.	reversed
The Collector	194 (1821)	Livingston	none	none	C.C.D. Md	affirmed
Anderson v. Dunn	204 (1821)	Johnson	none	none	C.C.D.C.	affirmed
La Conception	235 (1821)	Story	none	none	C.C.D.S.C.	reversed
Willinks v. Hollingsworth	240 (1821)	Marshall	none	none	C.C.D. Md	certification
Green v. Watkins	260 (1821)	Story	none	none	not indicated	certification
Cohens v. Virginia	264 (1821)	Marshall	none	none	Va. Q. Sess.	affirmed
Gibbons v. Ogden	448 (1821)	per curiam	none	none	N.Y.	dismissed
Sullivan v. Fulton Steamboat Company	450 (1821)	per curiam	none	none	C.C.S.D.N.Y.	affirmed
The Jonquille	452 (1821)	per curiam	none	none	C.C.D.N.C.	dismissed
Hughes v. Blake	453 (1821)	Livingston	none	none	C.C.D. Mass.	affirmed
Bartle v. Coleman	475 (1821)	Marshall	none	none	C.C.D.C.	reversed
Prevost v. Gratz	481 (1821)	Story	none	none	C.C.D. Pa.	reversed
Bowie v. Henderson	514 (1821)	Marshall	none	none	C.C.D.C.	affirmed
Spring v. South Carolina Insurance Company	519 (1821)	per curiam	none	none	C.C.D.S.C.	motion denied
United States v. Six Packages of Goods	520 (1821)	Livingston	none	none	C.C.S.D.N.Y.	affirmed
Brashier v. Gratz	528 (1821)	Marshall	none	none	C.C.D. Ky.	affirmed
United States v. Daniel	542 (1821)	Marshall	none	none	C.C.D.S.C.	certification
Kerr v. Watts	550 (1821)	Johnson	none	none	C.C.D. Ohio	reversed
Leeds v. Marine Insurance Company	565 (1821)	Johnson	none	none	C.C.D.C.	affirmed
Union Bank v. Hyde	572 (1821)	Johnson	none	none	C.C.D.C.	reversed
Clark v. Graham	577 (1821)	Todd	none	none	C.C.D. Ohio	affirmed
Preston's Heirs v. Bowmar	580 (1821)	Story	none	none	C.C.D. Ky.	affirmed
Otis v. Walter	583 (1821)	Livingston	none	none	Mass.	reversed
Goszler v. Town of Georgetown	593 (1821)	Marshall	none	none	C.C.D.C.	affirmed
M'Clung v. Silliman	598 (1821)	Johnson	none	none	Ohio	affirmed
Mutual Assurance Society v. Faxon	606 (1821)	Johnson	none	none	C.C.D.C.	affirmed

== See also ==
- certificate of division
