= Cohens v. Virginia =

Cohens v. Commonwealth of Virginia
- Supreme Court of the United States

Decided March 3, 1821
- Full case name: P.J. Cohen and M.J. Cohen v. Commonwealth of Virginia
- Citations: 19 U.S. 264 (more) 6 Wheat. 264; 5 L. Ed. 257; 1821 U.S. LEXIS 362

Holding
- State laws in opposition to federal laws are void. The Supreme Court has appellate jurisdiction and makes the final decision for any U.S. case.

Court membership
- Chief Justice John Marshall Associate Justices Bushrod Washington · William Johnson; H. Brockholst Livingston · Thomas Todd; Gabriel Duvall · Joseph Story

Case opinion
- Majority: Marshall, joined by unanimous

Cohens v. Virginia, 19 U.S. (6 Wheat.) 264 (1821), is a landmark case by the Supreme Court of the United States that asserts the Court's power to review state supreme court decisions in criminal law matters if defendants claim that their constitutional rights have been violated. The Court had previously asserted a similar jurisdiction over civil cases involving U.S. parties (see Martin v. Hunter's Lessee).

The defendants were members of a prominent Baltimore banking family. A U.S. senator and two U.S. representatives served as attorneys for the opposing sides. The two defendants, Mendes I. Cohen and Philip I. Cohen, would later rise to the positions of U.S. Army Colonel and Maryland Delegate (Mendes), and U.S. Postmaster (Philip).

== Background ==
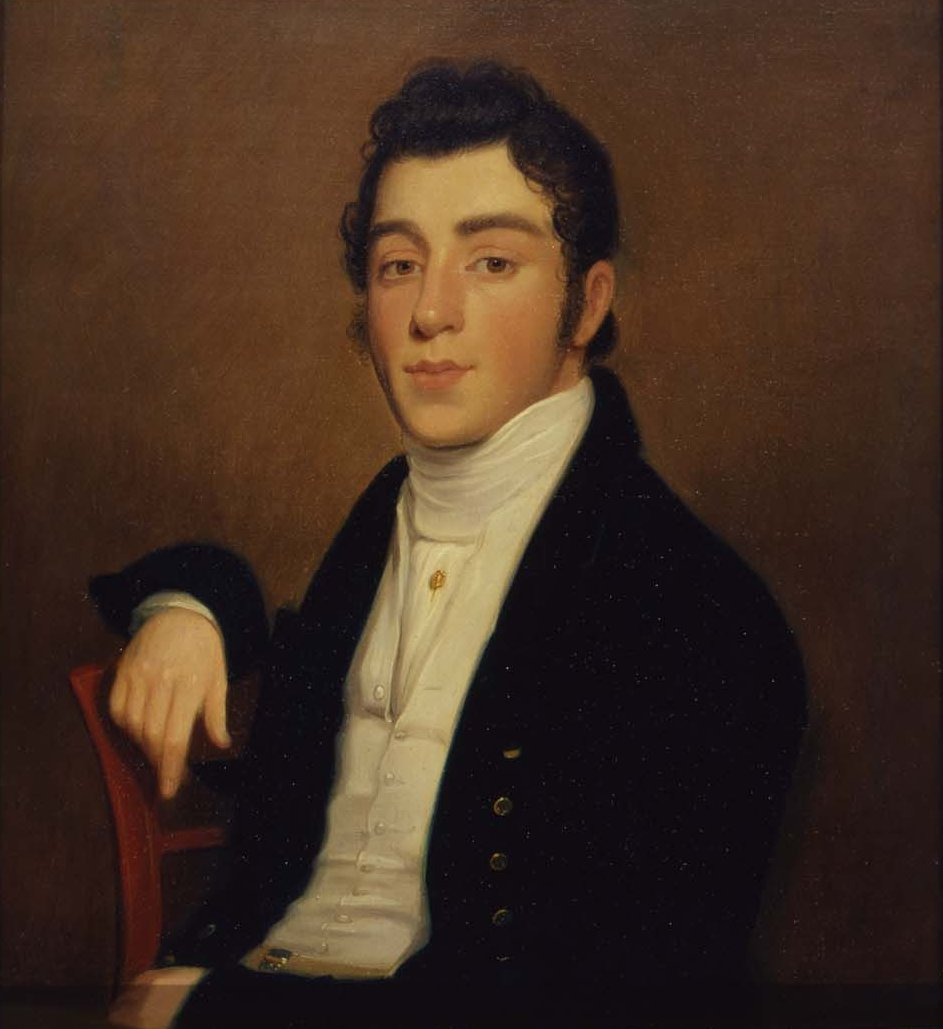
1818 portrait of Mendes I. Cohen by artist Joseph Wood. Smithsonian American Art Museum.

Congress passed a bill to establish a National Lottery to raise money for the District of Columbia that was conducted by the municipal government. Meanwhile, Virginia had established its own state lotteries and passed a law to prohibit the sale of out-of-state lottery tickets.

Philip and Mendes Cohen were brothers and managed the Norfolk, Virginia, branch of Cohens Lottery and Exchange Office of Baltimore, Maryland. The Cohen firm was a leading vendor of lottery tickets in the United States through its offices in New York, Philadelphia, Charleston, and Norfolk and nationwide through the mail. The firm had a strong reputation in an otherwise-unsavory field and was known for quick payouts to winners. Their reputation helped the firm later become successful in the insurance and banking fields. The firm had been established in 1812 by an older brother, Jacob I. Cohen, Jr., who brought each of his five brothers into the firm. He later was elected to and served as a president of the Baltimore City Council.

On June 1, 1820, both Cohens were charged by authorities in Norfolk with selling tickets in Virginia for the National Lottery. The brothers were convicted in a local court and fined $100.

The issue was significant as "lotteries were one of the chief means by which governments raised capital in the" early 19th century. The case challenged the "free flow of commerce" embodied in the U.S. Constitution and could have emboldened other states to challenge the sale of National Lottery tickets in their jurisdictions.

The Cohens hired two of the country's top lawyers for their appeal: U.S. Senator William Pinkney of Maryland and David A. Ogden, who had recently retired as a U.S. Representative from New York. Pinkney, an acquaintance of the Cohen family and a strong proponent of the Necessary and Proper Clause and the doctrine of sovereign immunity, organized a public relations campaign on behalf of the federal government's powers in this case.

== Judicial history ==
The state courts found that the Virginia law prohibiting sale of out-of-state lotteries could be enforced, notwithstanding the act of Congress authorizing the D.C. lottery. The Cohens appealed to the United States Supreme Court by arguing that their conduct was protected by the Act of Congress authorizing the D.C. lottery.

== Supreme Court ==
The Supreme Court concluded with two opinions on this case that were published on succeeding days. The first opinion, containing the major rulings of constitutional and historical significance, concerned Virginia's motion to dismiss for purported lack of US Supreme Court jurisdiction. The ruling was issued on March 2, 1821, and asserted the Supreme Court's constitutional right to jurisdiction in this case. Having resolved the significant jurisdictional issues, the Court issued an opinion the next day on the merits of the case: it construed the Congressional statute as authorizing a lottery only in the City of Washington, District of Columbia. (At the time, the District of Columbia consisted of two cities, the other being Alexandria. In the 1840s, it was retroceded to the State of Virginia so that its major slave market could be operated outside the federal capital.) It upheld the convictions of the Cohens in Virginia.

=== Decision ===
The main issue in Cohens v. Virginia was the preliminary issue of whether the Supreme Court had jurisdiction to hear an appeal in a criminal case decided by the courts of Virginia. Virginia argued that the U.S. Constitution does not give the Supreme Court appellate jurisdiction over criminal judgments by the state courts. Virginia also argued that the U.S. Constitution does not give the Supreme Court appellate jurisdiction over cases in which a state is a party. In effect, Virginia argued that its decision was final and could not be reviewed by the federal courts even though the decision involved the interpretation and application of an act of Congress. Virginia asserted that it had an unreviewable right to interpret and apply federal law as it saw fit.

The Supreme Court relied on Article III, Section 2, of the U.S. Constitution, which grants the Supreme Court jurisdiction in "all Cases, in Law and Equity, arising under this Constitution, the Laws of the United States, and Treaties made, or which shall be made, under their Authority." The Court found that the U.S. Constitution provides no exceptions to this grant of jurisdiction for cases arising in the state courts or for cases in which a state is a party. Therefore, under its language, all cases arising under federal law are within its grant of appellate jurisdiction. That conclusion was reinforced by the Supremacy Clause of Article VI, which makes federal law superior to state law.

The Court stated that if state court decisions involving federal law were unreviewable by the federal courts, each state could prevent the federal government from executing federal laws in that state and thus allow each state a veto power over federal law. The Court found that to be inconsistent with the language and the intent of the U.S. Constitution, including the explicit grant of judicial power to the federal courts:

"There is certainly nothing in the circumstances under which our Constitution was formed, nothing in the history of the times, which would justify the opinion that the confidence reposed in the States was so implicit as to leave in them and their tribunals the power of resisting or defeating, in the form of law, the legitimate measures of the Union." The Court said that the Constitution's framers had decided to "confer on the judicial department the power of construing the Constitution and laws of the Union in every case, in the last resort, and of preserving them from all violation from every quarter, so far as judicial decisions can preserve them."

The Court also said that unless state court decisions involving federal law could be reviewed by federal courts, there would be as many interpretations of federal law as there are states. Quoting "Federalist No. 80," the Court found that the Constitution was not intended to create "a hydra in government from which nothing but contradiction and confusion can proceed." Rather, relying on "Federalist No. 82," the Court found that the framers intended for the Supreme Court to have appellate jurisdiction over state court cases involving federal law.

Accordingly, the Supreme Court found no restriction or limitation on the plain language of the Constitution granting it appellate jurisdiction over all cases arising under the Constitution or laws of the United States. The Court, therefore, had jurisdiction over the appeal from the Virginia courts.

Having found that it had jurisdiction, the Supreme Court upheld the Cohens' convictions. The Court found that Congress did not intend to authorize the sale of National Lottery tickets outside the District of Columbia. Therefore, there was no conflict between the act of Congress authorizing a lottery there and Virginia's statute prohibiting sale of out-of-state lotteries within its boundaries.

== See also ==
- List of United States Supreme Court cases, volume 19
