= Judith Solomon Cohen =

American matriarch of Baltimore Maryland Jewish family

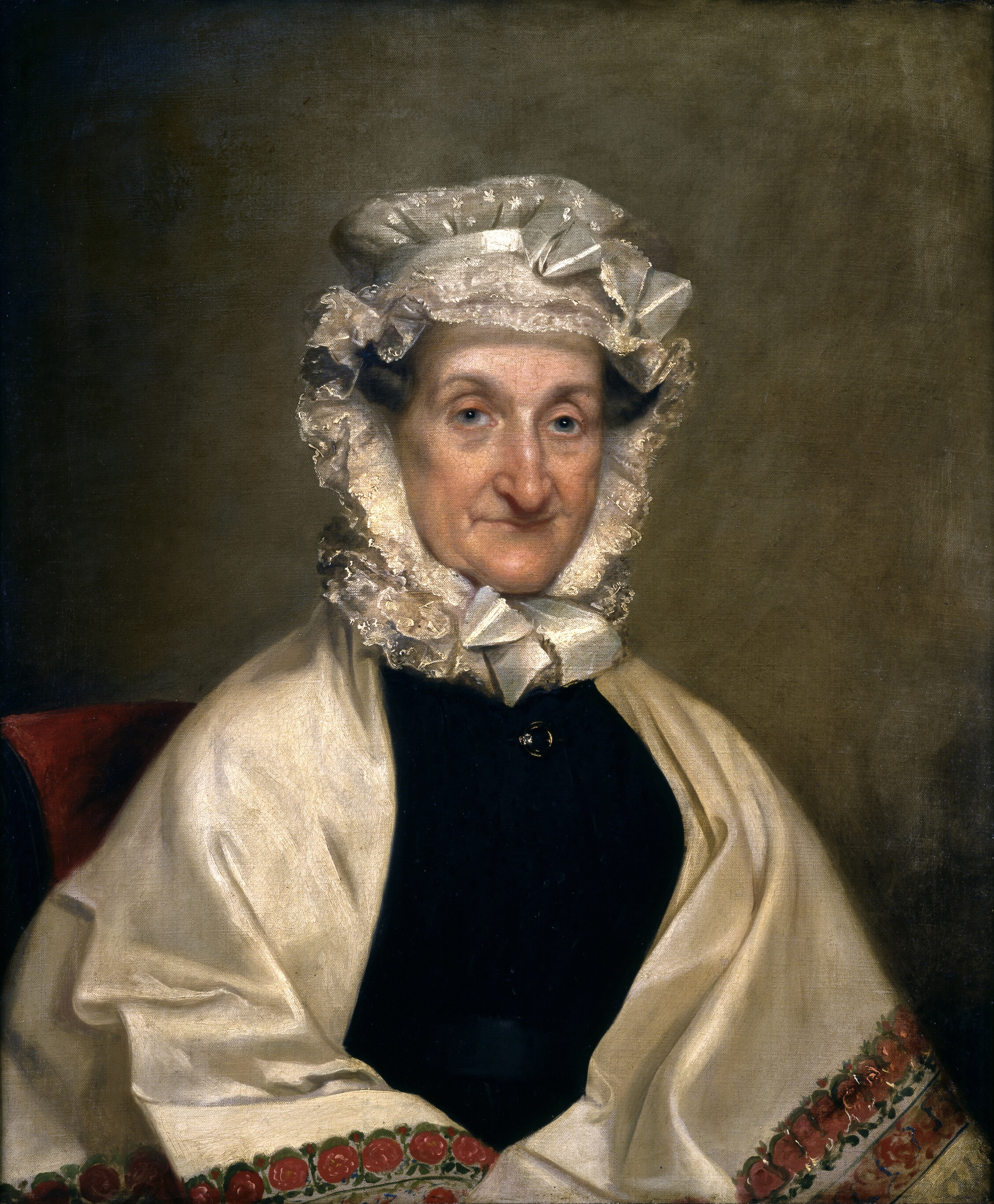
- Portrait, c. 1830–1835
- Born: December 21, 1766; Bristol, England
- Died: April 5, 1837 (aged 70); Baltimore, Maryland

Judith Solomon Cohen (December 21, 1766 – April 5, 1837) was the matriarch of one of the earliest Jewish families in Baltimore, Maryland.

She was born in Bristol, England in 1766. She married Israel I. Cohen, who was originally from Oberdorf Germany, on 1786, in England. The couple had emigrated to Richmond, Virginia, by 1784, where Israel worked temporarily as a constable. He was one of the founders of the Congregation Beth Shalome as well as a subscriber to shares of the Academy of Arts and Sciences of the United States of America.

The couple had nine children: Joshua (1788-1788); Jacob Jr. (1789-1869); Solomon (b. 1791); Philip (1793-1852); Maria (1794-1834); Mendes (1796-1879); Benjamin (1797-1845); David (1800-1847); Joshua (1801-1870); and Edward (1802-1803).

When Israel died on July 29, 1803, his house and belongings were auctioned off because at that time women could not own property. Cohen moved her seven children to Baltimore, where she became a boarder at the home of Shinah Solomon Etting. Her son Benjamin later married Etting's daughter Kitty and the couple became part of Baltimore's elite social circle.

In 1813, Cohen's sons founded Cohen's Lottery and Exchange. The lottery was very successful and the brothers opened five branch offices in other cities. It published its own four-page newspaper, Cohen's Gazette and Lottery Register, from 1814 until 1830, containing lottery and financial news. In 1831, they opened Jacob I. Cohen, Jr. and Brothers Banking House.

The Cohen family lived in a large house on North Charles Street where they kept kosher and held daily services. In the 1850s, they sponsored the short-lived Sephardic Congregation.

Judith Solomon Cohen died in Baltimore on April 5, 1837. The family purchased a tract for her burial on Saratoga Street; it would be used for family burials until the 1970s, when the family was reinterred at Baltimore Hebrew Cemetery.

== See also ==
- History of the Jews in Baltimore
