= Maryland Anti-BDS Law =

2017 Maryland executive order

Executive Order 01.01.2017.25
- Coat of arms of Maryland

Governor of Maryland
- Long title: Prohibiting Discriminatory Boycotts of Israel in State Procurement
- Passed: October 23, 2017
- Signed by: Larry Hogan
- Introduced by: Larry Hogan

The Maryland Anti-BDS Law officially Executive Order 01.01.2017.25: Prohibiting Discriminatory Boycotts of Israel in State Procurement was an executive order signed by Maryland Governor Larry Hogan on October 23, 2017. It was an Anti-BDS law which prohibits, "...all executive branch agencies from entering into contracts or conducting official state business with any entity unless they certify that they will not engage in a boycott of Israel during the duration of the contract."

== Background ==
The Boycott, Divestment and Sanctions (BDS) movement is an international campaign launched in 2005 that calls for economic pressure on Israel to influence its policies toward Palestinians. In response, multiple U.S. states adopted laws or executive actions restricting state business with entities participating in such boycotts.

Del. Benjamin F. Kramer, called the BDS movement... "nothing new—it’s straight out of the anti-Semite’s playbook dating back to the Middle Ages."

== Provisions ==
The executive order (officially Executive Order 01.01.2017.25) directs Maryland executive branch agencies to:

- Refrain from entering into procurement contracts with business entities unless the entity certifies that it is not engaging in a boycott of Israel
- Apply the requirement to contracts valued at $100,000 or more
- Limit applicability to companies with 10 or more employees

The order defines a boycott of Israel as actions intended to penalize or limit commercial relations with Israel or businesses operating in Israel.

== Criticism ==
The law was met with criticism. Human Rights Watch claimed the law was used to "...punish responsible businesses." In 2019, the Council on American-Islamic Relations filed a lawsuit claiming that the law violated the First Amendment to the United States Constitution. US District Judge Catherine Blake threw out the lawsuit.

In January 2026, CAIR called on Governor Wes Moore to repeal the executive order.

== See also ==
- Jew Bill
