= David Edwin =

English-American engraver (1776–1841)

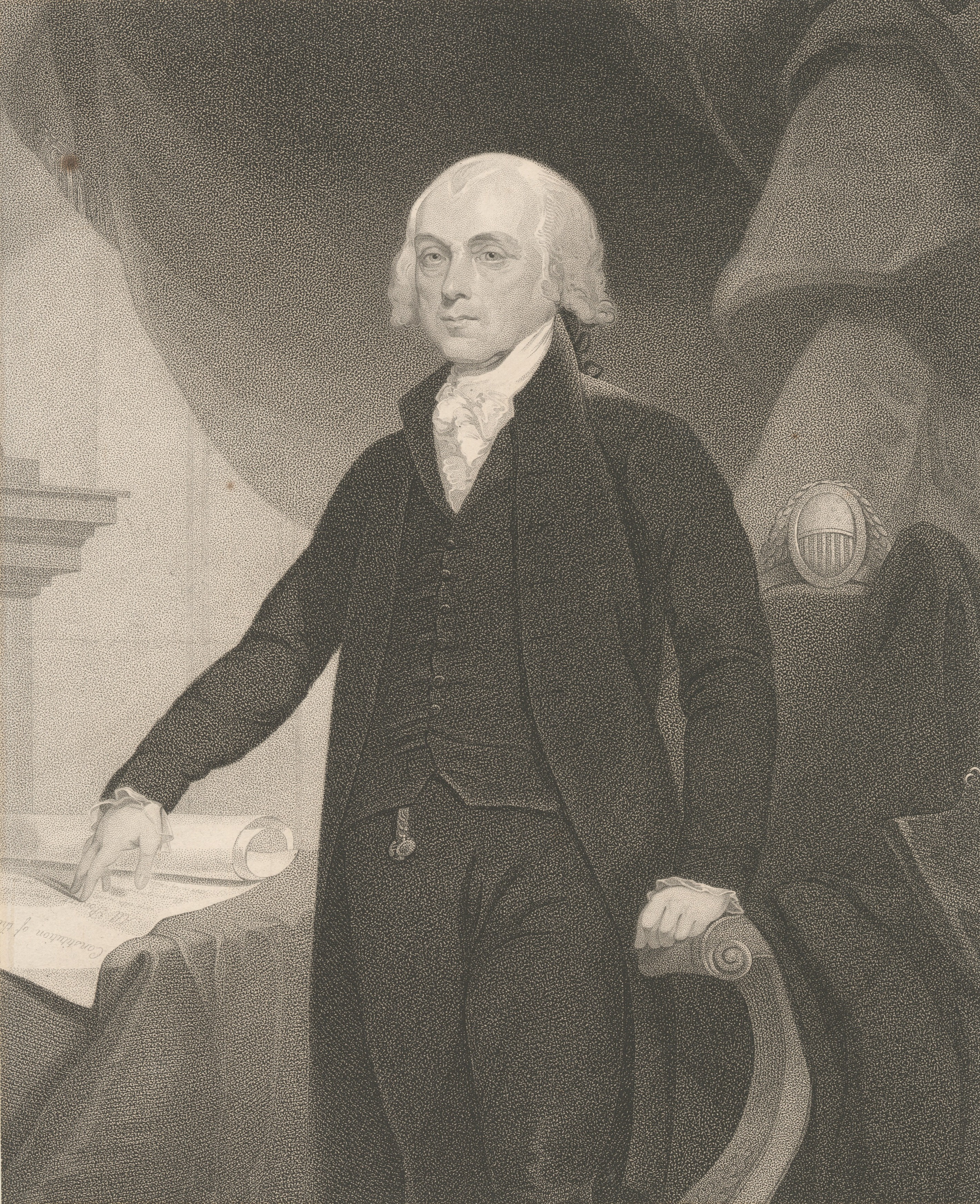
James Madison, 1809-1817

David Edwin (1776–1841) was an English-American engraver. He was born in Bath, England. He was the son of John Edwin, a comic actor, and was apprenticed to an engraver, but he ran away to sea and reached America in 1797. There he was employed by Edward Savage, the portrait painter. After twenty years' work his sight failed and he was compelled to resort to various means to obtain a livelihood. He died in Philadelphia in 1841.

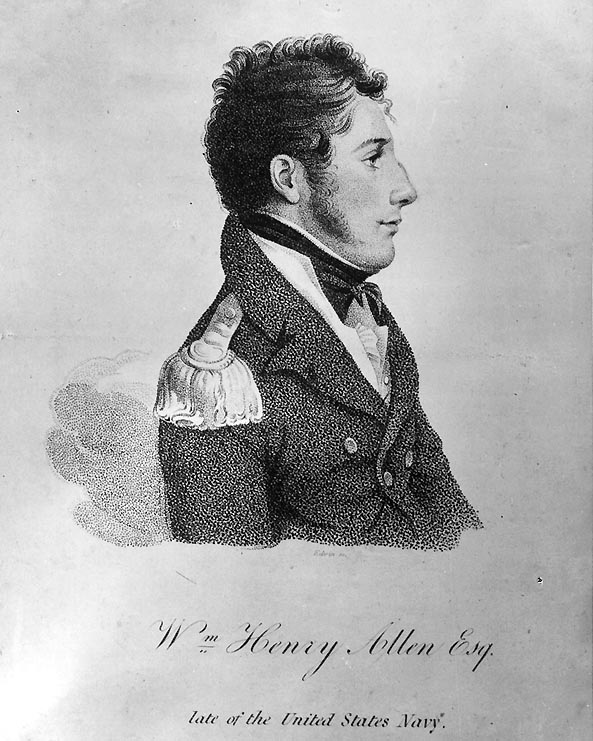
William Henry Allen
