= Joseph Wood (painter) =

American painter (1778 - c.1832)

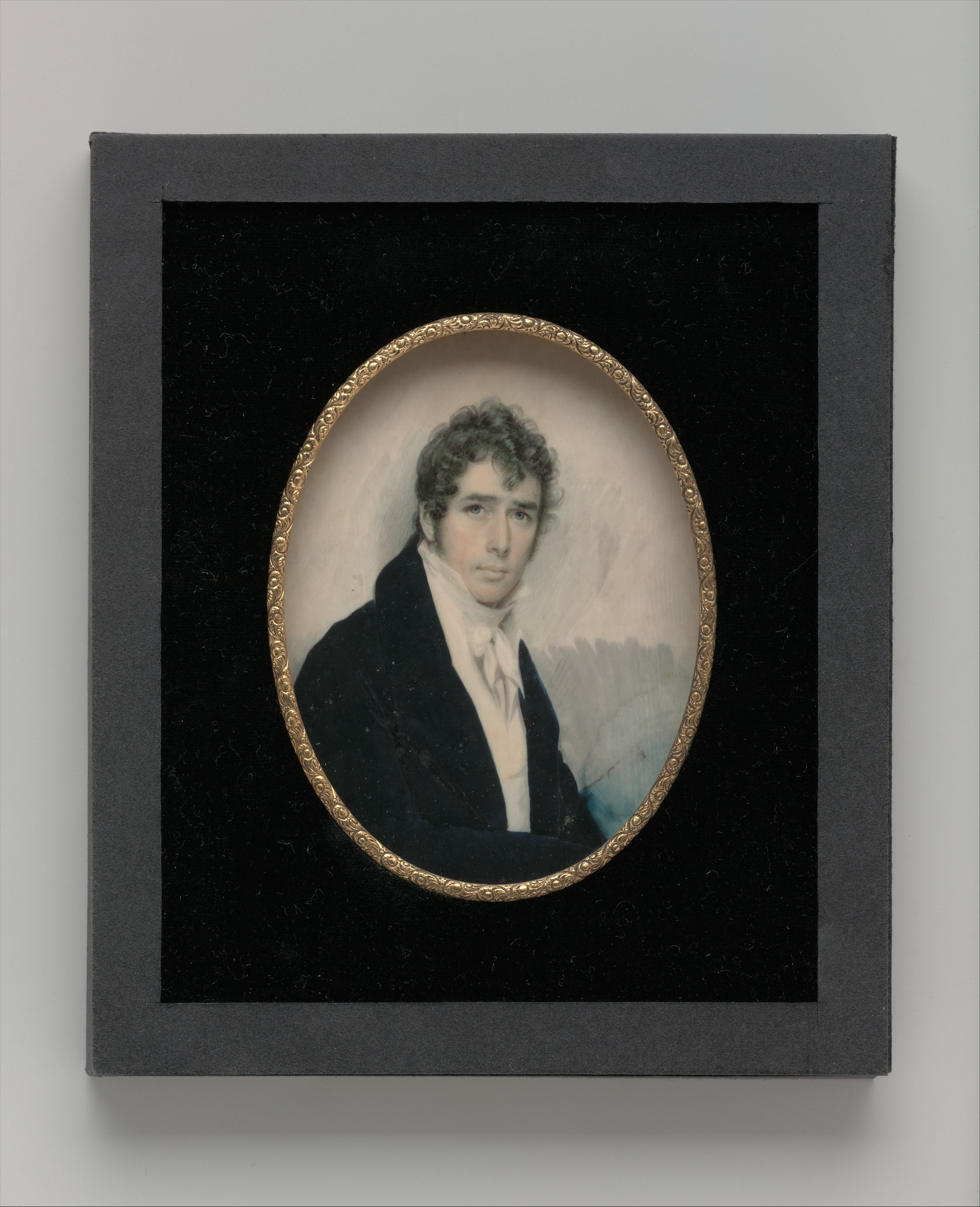
A c. 1810 self-portrait by Wood, in watercolor on ivory, currently in the collection of the Metropolitan Museum of Art

Joseph Wood (c. 1778 – June 15, 1830) was an American painter noted mainly for his portraits.

Wood was born near Clarkstown, New York, and in 1793 apprenticed to a silversmith. In 1801 he became a miniature painter and studied with Edward Greene Malbone. From 1802 until 1810 he had a professional partnership with John Wesley Jarvis. The two produced engravings, miniatures, and portrait paintings. He then worked in Philadelphia from 1813 to 1816, then in Washington, D.C., from 1816 to 1830. In his later years he ran an art school and served as a draftsman for patent applications. He died in Washington, D.C.
