= Jew Bill =

1826 Maryland law

- Coat of arms of Maryland

Maryland General Assembly
- Long title: An Act to extend to the sect of people professing the Jewish religion, the same rights and privileges enjoyed by Christians
- Passed: January 5, 1826
- Signed by: Samuel Stevens, Jr.
- Introduced by: Thomas Kennedy

The Jew Bill (more formally, "An Act to extend to the sect of people professing the Jewish religion, the same rights and privileges enjoyed by Christians") was passed in 1826 by the Maryland General Assembly to allow Jews to hold public office in the state.

The bill was passed on January 5, 1826, "after a long and arduous struggle." The long struggle over the Jew Bill attracted widespread newspaper coverage and occasioned significant debate over the relationship between race and citizenship. The ability to follow a morally-binding belief in the afterlife, also known as "a future state of rewards and punishments" was in question due to the variety of interpretations of the afterlife present in Judaism. "Jewish beliefs in the afterlife are as diverse as Judaism itself," modern scholars profess. The Jew Bill altered the state's constitution to allow Jews to hold public office upon swearing to (or affirming) a belief in "a future state of rewards and punishments"; previously, the state's constitution required public officeholders to make "a declaration of a belief in the Christian religion." The fight to pass it was led in the early 1820s by Jacob I. Cohen Jr. (1789–1869) and Solomon Etting (1764–1847), who subsequently ran successfully for Baltimore City Council and became the first Jews to hold elected office in Maryland. Maryland was among the last US states to remove a prohibition on Jews holding public office.

Arguing on behalf of the change, Thomas Kennedy, a Christian who had been elected to the Maryland legislature, said, "There are few Jews in the United States. In Maryland there are very few. But if there was only one — to that one, we ought to do justice."

== See also ==
- Antisemitism in Maryland
- History of the Jews in Maryland
