= Shinah Solomon Etting =

Jewish woman in colonial Baltimore

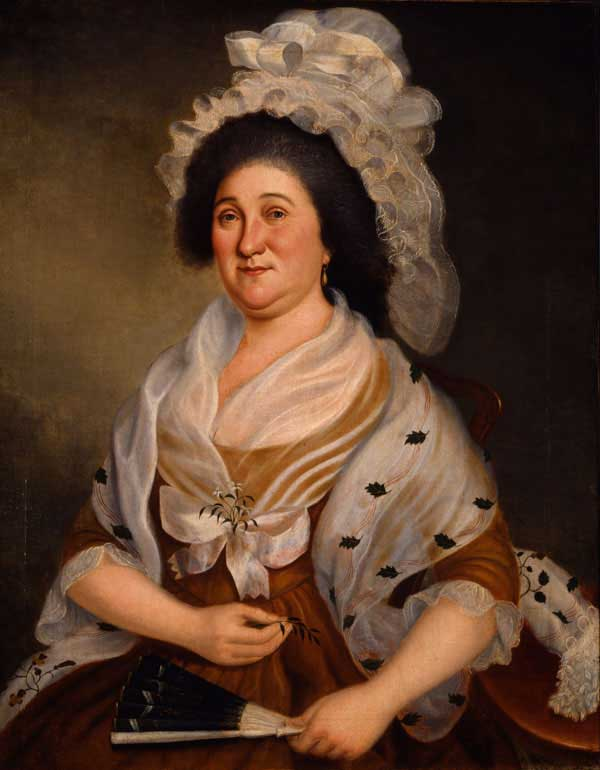
- Etting painted by Charles Peale Polk
- Born: December 24, 1744
- Died: November 30, 1822 (aged 77)

Shinah Solomon Etting (December 24, 1744 – November 30, 1822) was the matriarch of one of the first Jewish families to live in Baltimore, Maryland.

== Biography ==
Etting was born in New York City to Lancaster merchant Joseph Solomon and Bilah Myer-Cohen Solomon. She had two brothers, Isaac (1742–1798) and Levy (1748–1827). In November 1759, she married 35-year-old Elijah Etting and the couple moved to York, Pennsylvania, where they had eight children—Reuben, Solomon, Joseph, Fanny, Elizabeth, Kitty, Hetty and Sally—all of whom lived to adulthood except Joseph.

She and her husband ran a small store in York where they hosted Alexander Graydon in the summer of 1773. He wrote about the pleasant hospitality he received in the Etting home, describing Shinah in particular as was "always in spirits, full of frolic and glee, and possessing the talent of singing agreeably...."

When Elijah died in 1778, Shinah moved to Baltimore with her younger children around 1780, though the exact date is unknown. Using her inheritance, she had a small boarding house built to her specifications, as a lodging house "for gentlemen." She took in boarders, among them Judith Cohen, the widow of Israel Cohen, and her children. Both families had sons who rose to prominence in Baltimore. Etting used the profits from her successful inn to assist her two prominent sons in their business ventures. She was a stockholder in Union Bank in 1796, along with two of her sons and two of her daughters.

Etting had her portrait painted twice by Charles Peale Polk in the first half of the 1790s. One of the paintings is considered "one of his more successful portraits." An additional portrait was painted of her by John Wesley Jarvis in 1813.

Her son Solomon and her brother Levy purchased the "Jew's burying ground" in Baltimore in 1799. The cemetery which became known as the Etting Cemetery, was the oldest Jewish cemetery in Baltimore. Solomon Etting and Jacob Cohen were elected to the Baltimore City Council in 1826 a few months after the state constitution was amended to modify the requirement that elected officials swear a "Christian oath." Etting Street in Northwest Baltimore is named for Solomon Etting. Her son Reuben was appointed United States Marshal for Maryland by President Jefferson in 1801 and served through 1804.

== See also ==
- History of the Jews in Baltimore
- History of the Jews in Maryland
- History of the Jews in Colonial America
