= Solomon Etting =

Jewish merchant and politician in Maryland, US

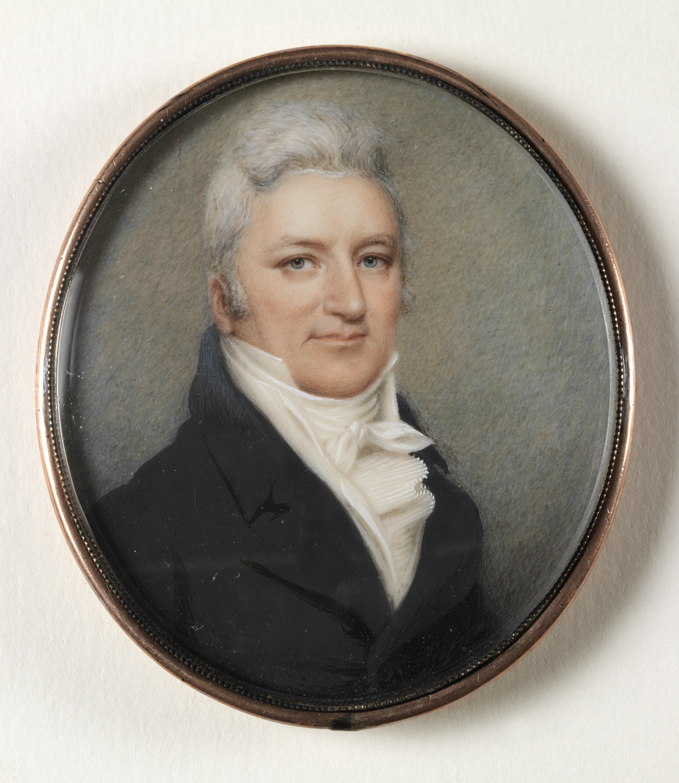
- Born: 28 July 1764
- Died: 6 August 1847

Solomon Etting (28 July 1764 – 6 August 1847) was a Jewish merchant and politician who was born in York, Pennsylvania. Solomon was born to Shinah Solomon Etting and Elijah Etting. Solomon lived in York, Lancaster, and Baltimore.

== Biography ==
Solomon and his older brother Rueben took over their father's business after Elijah died in 1778. His mother and his five sisters moved to Baltimore in 1780, where he would join them in 1791 and would live there for the rest of his life. Solomon was a trained shochet, by a family friend, and became the first American-born shochet. He married Reyna Simon, and opened a general store with his father-in-law, Joseph Simon, in Lancaster.

After his wife, Reyna died in 1790, Solomon moved briefly to Philadelphia. He married, Rachel Gratz, the daughter who was his shochet instructor in 1791. Shortly marriage, the couple moved to Baltimore to join his mother and sisters. He opened a hardware store and invested in shipping and trade. He rose to prominence in the city and became a director of Union Bank in 1796 and helped found the Baltimore Water Company in 1797. He would also become a director of the Baltimore and Ohio Railroad.

He also became politically active, joining the Democratic-Republicans, later a Republican. He helped present opposition to the Jay Treaty to George Washington in 1793. He also served on the Committee of Vigilance and Safety during the War of 1812. The Committee coordinated the defense of Baltimore during the Chesapeake campaign.

Similar to Baltimoreans of his social and economic status, Solomon owned slaves. On 3 October 1796, Etting placed an advertisement in the Federal Gazette seeking the return of an escaped slave named "Darkey". In the advertisement, Etting noted that he had paid $200 for the slave. Solomon would join the Maryland State Colonization Society, which sought to resettle freed slaves in Africa.

Upon the death of his infant daughter Rebecca in 1799, Solomon purchased a plot known as "the Jews burial ground," which became known as the Etting Cemetery. The Etting Cemetery is the oldest extant Jewish cemetery in Baltimore.

Maryland banned non-Christians from holding office or practicing law. In 1797, Etting and his father-in-law, Bernard Gratz, petitioned to "be placed upon the same footing with other good citizens," but were unsuccessful then, as were subsequent attempts in 1802 and 1824. Baltimore banker Jacob I. Cohen Jr. was another prominent advocate for Jewish political rights in Maryland.

Etting followed the example of another Jewish immigrant, Jacob Henry, in seeking equal political rights. In 1809, Henry, a resident of North Carolina, challenged the state's exclusion of non-Protestants from public office in a speech before its House of Commons. He asserted his inalienable right to serve, and the House supported his position. Henry asked, "Will you drive from your shores and from the shelter of your constitution all who do not lay their oblations on the same altar, observe the same ritual, and subscribe to the same dogmas? If so, which among the various sects into which we are divided shall be the favored one?"

Around 1820, approximately 4,000 Jews lived in the United States, but only seven of the original 13 states recognized them politically equal.

In 1826, the "Jew Bill" finally passed, allowing Jews to hold public office by swearing to believe in "the doctrine of reward and punishment" rather than the customary declaration of Christian faith. Etting was then elected to the Baltimore City Council. At that time, the American Jewish population had grown to 6,000.

The writer George Henry Miles was Solomon's great-grandnephew.

== See also ==
- History of the Jews in Baltimore
- History of the Jews in Maryland
