= Congregation Beth Israel (Honesdale, Pennsylvania) =

Reform Jewish synagogue in Honesdale, Pennsylvania, US

- Hebrew: בית ישראל
- Location in Pennsylvania

Religion
- Affiliation: Reform Judaism
- Ecclesiastical or organizational status: Synagogue
- Leadership: Rabbi Elliott Kleinman
- Status: Active

Location
- Location: 615 Court Street, Honesdale, Pennsylvania
- Country: United States
- Interactive map of Congregation Beth Israel
- Coordinates: 41°34′17″N 75°15′09″W

Architecture
- Style: Synagogue
- Founder: Colonial meeting house
- General contractor: Delaware and Hudson Canal Company
- Established: 1849 (as a congregation)
- Completed: 1856

Specifications
- Capacity: 50–85 worshippers
- Materials: Clapboard

Website
- congregationbethisraelhonesdale.org

Congregation Beth Israel (Hebrew: בית ישראל) is a Reform Jewish synagogue located at 615 Court Street, Honesdale, Pennsylvania, in the United States. Founded in 1849 by German Jews, its 1856 synagogue building was the smallest in the United States. The congregation was originally Orthodox, but rapidly moved to "Classical Reform". In the 1930s and 1940s an influx of more traditional Eastern European Jews prompted a change from Classical Reform to Traditional Reform.

The congregation was always small, and went through long periods where it had no rabbi. During other periods, particularly from 1939 to 1954, rabbis' tenures were very short, often a year or less.

As of 2014, Allan L. Smith, had served as the congregation's rabbi for over 40 years. The current Rabbi is Elliott Kleinman. The synagogue building was the second oldest in the United States still occupied by its original congregation.

== History ==
The congregation was founded by Jews of German background. In the spring of 1849 the first Jewish family settled in Honesdale, and by the fall the congregation had been organized. By 1854 the congregation also had a Hebrew school. Originally Orthodox, the congregation moved rapidly to "Classical Reform". The congregation's first spiritual leader was a Rabbi Kutner.

Between 1880 and 1890 many Jewish families left Honesdale. The congregation was able to maintain a full-time local rabbi until 1891, but could not afford one afterwards. Rabbis (typically student rabbis from the Reform Hebrew Union College or Jewish Institute of Religion) would officiate only at High Holiday and some festival services. Other services were held on Friday nights, and were lay-led.

At the turn of the century and in the early 20th century, Honesdale had two synagogues, Beth Israel and Sherith Israel. Nevertheless, the Jewish community remained small; by 1918 there were only 29 Jews in Honesdale, Beth Israel was the only synagogue, and it had no rabbi. In the 1930s and 1940s an influx of more traditional Jews of Eastern European backgrounds prompted a slow change to more traditional practices (though still Reform). By 1942, the Jewish population of Honesdale had reached around 75. The bulk of the costs associated with running the synagogue were underwritten by Honesdale's Katz Underwear Company, with additional funds raised by the Temple Sisterhood.

From the late 1930s to the early 1950s the congregation was served by a series of short-tenured rabbis, typically serving for one year or less. These included Joseph Friedman (1939), Baruch Braunstein (1940–1942), Hebrew Weiner (1943–1944), Rafield Helman (1945), Jay Robert Brinkman (1946), Morris Friedman (1947), Jerome Spivak (1948), Bernard Bamburger (1949), Samuel Volkman (1949), Abraham Granison (1949), Bernard Perlmutter (1950), Harold Spevak (1951), Bernard Zlotovitz (1952), Kenneth Rivkin (1953), Jerome Davidson (1954), and Julius Kravitz (1958). Beth Israel had no rabbi in the 1960s, and in the 1970s was served by Harvey Rosenfeld (1970–1971), Lewis Bogage (1972–1978), and Leonard Troop (1978). Bogage shared the duties with Allan L. Smith. Since 1979, Smith has served as rabbi on his own. The congregation celebrated its 125th anniversary in 1974, with rabbi and historian Jacob Rader Marcus as speaker. Rabbi Smith retired in 2015. Rabbi Elliott Kleinman has served the congregation from that time to the present.

== Building ==
Beth Israel's Colonial meeting house-style building, dedicated in 1856, was for many years the smallest synagogue in the United States, and possibly the world. Constructed of white clapboard, it had a gold Star of David at the tip of its spire. The building held 50 to 85 people.

The land for the synagogue building was donated by a non-Jew, who also donated money towards its construction. The synagogue was built by the Delaware and Hudson Canal Company to attract Jewish merchants. The company installed pews with kneelers underneath them, not realizing that Jews do not normally kneel in prayer. The congregation left them in, "partly as a gesture of recognition that they were installed in good faith". It is one of the oldest synagogues in the United States; only Congregation Kahal Kadosh Beth Elohim has been in the same building longer.

In 1933 "gothic type" stained glass windows were added to the building. These were lost during a flood one Friday night in 1942, when the Lackawaxen River overflowed its banks. An annex was added in 1962, which, at the time caused great controversy among the members. The building underwent a restoration in 1985. The sanctuary is decorated with "a magnificent chandelier and Tiffany globe sconces".

As of 2014, it was the second oldest synagogue building in the United States still occupied by its original congregation.

== Recent events ==
Rabbi and head of the Union for Reform Judaism Alexander Schindler was speaker at the 150th anniversary in 1999.

Beth Israel's current membership is "a combination of long time local residents, as well as those who have relocated to Northeastern Pennsylvania from nearby metropolitan areas such as New York, New Jersey, and Philadelphia. Members come from Wayne, Pike, Monroe, Lackawanna, and Susquehanna" counties. Unlike most Jewish congregations, Beth Israel does not require attendees to pay for High Holy Day tickets.

As of 2014, the rabbi was Allan L. Smith. He had served the congregation since 1972, and for much of that time also served as the director of the Youth Division of the Union for Reform Judaism. Rabbi Smith retired in 2015. Rabbi Elliott Kleinman has served from that time to the present.
