= List of the oldest synagogues in the United States =

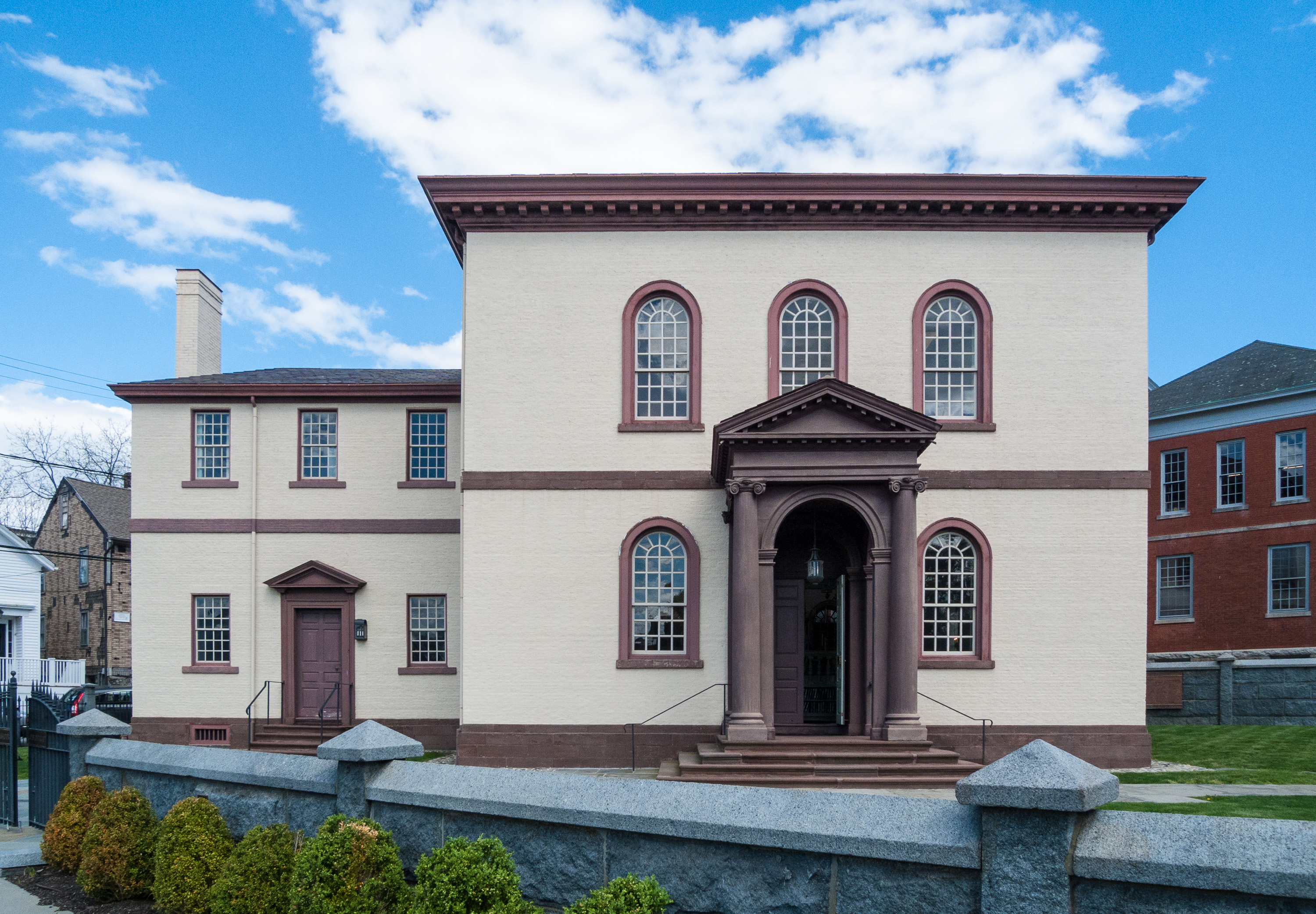
Touro Synagogue, Newport, Rhode Island (founded c. 1658, built 1759–63)

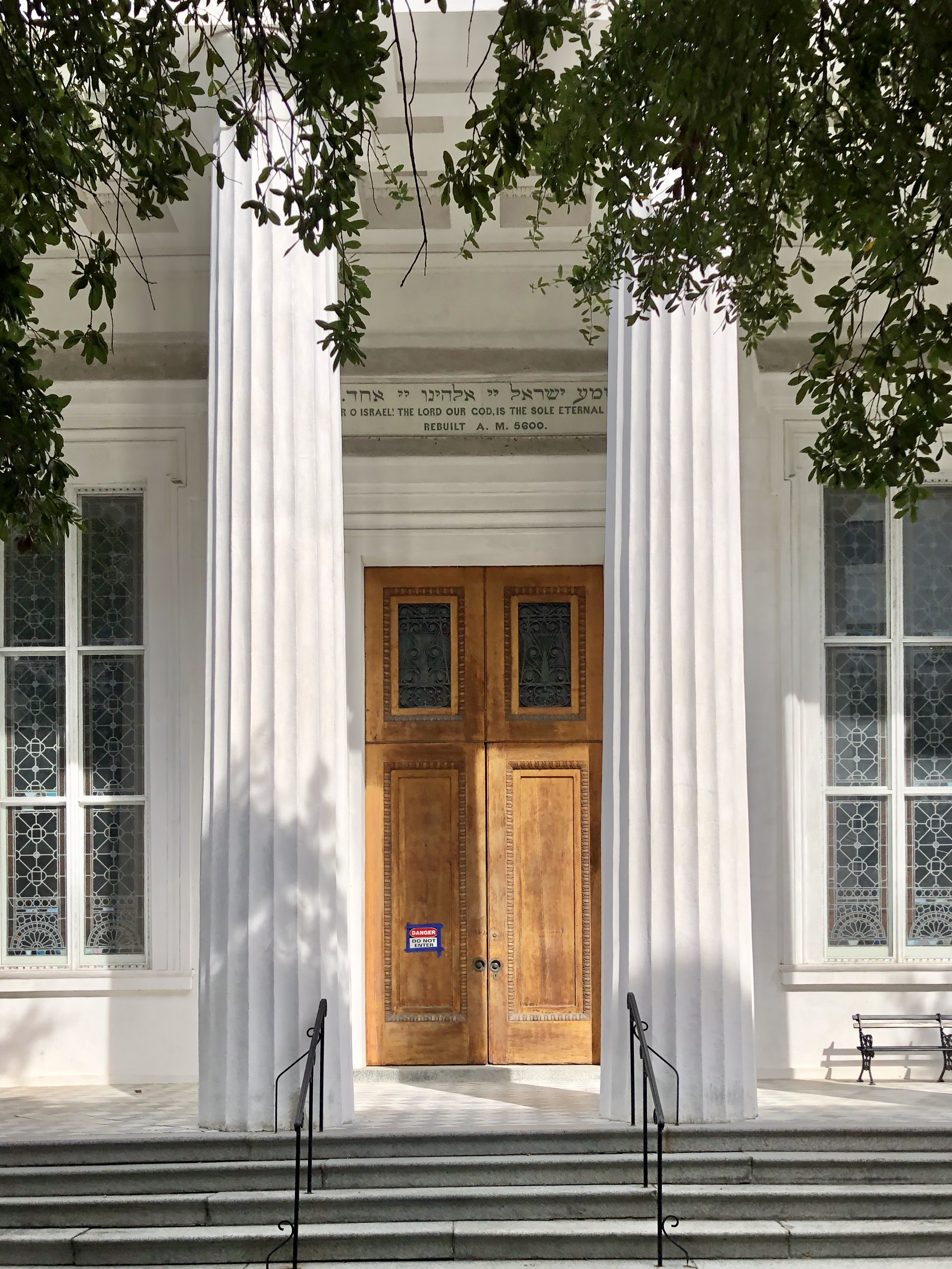
Kahal Kadosh Beth Elohim Synagogue, Charleston, South Carolina (founded 1749, built 1840–41)

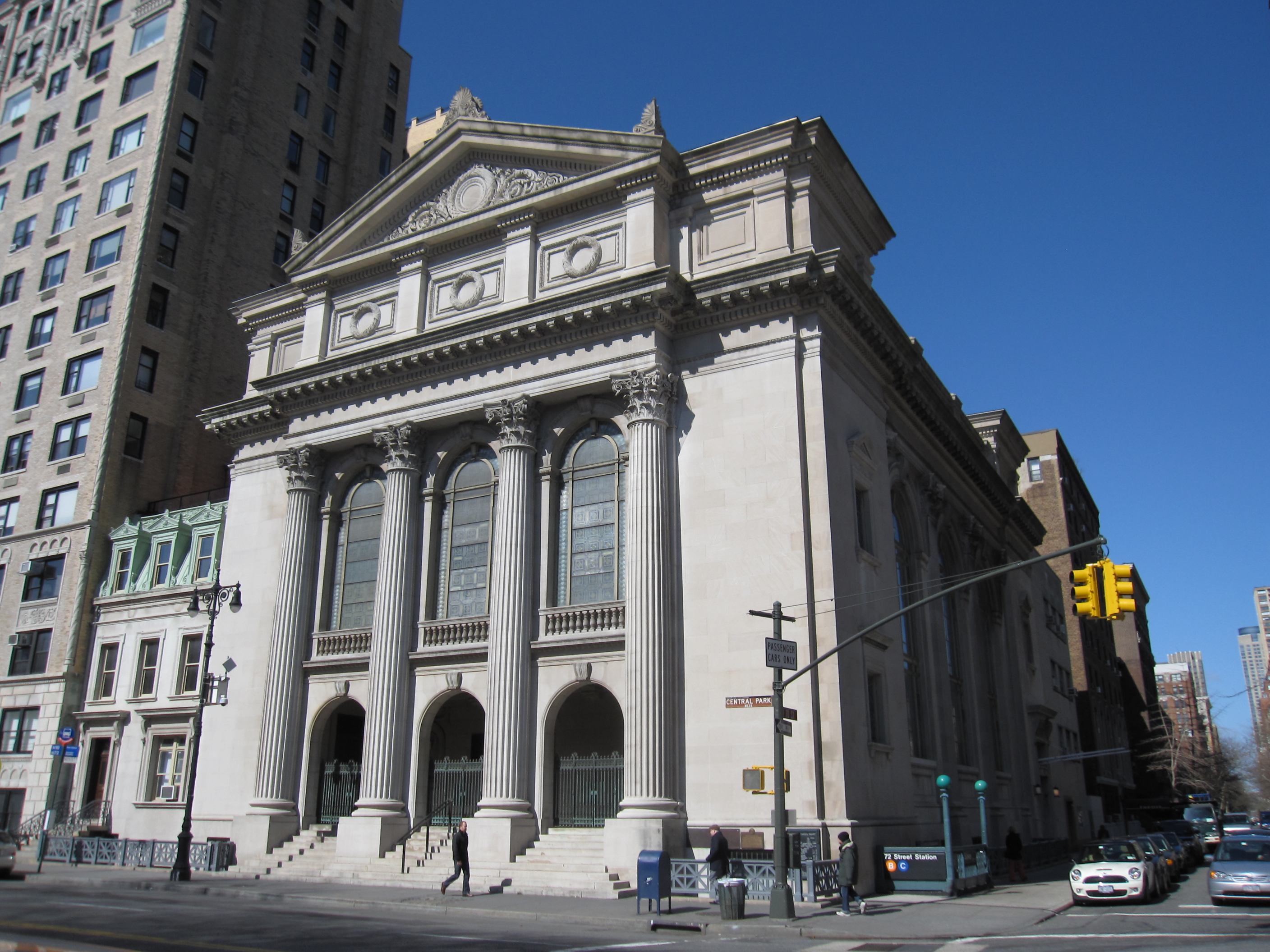
Congregation Shearith Israel, New York, New York (founded 1654, built 1896–97)

Synagogues may be considered "oldest" based on different criteria such as oldest surviving building or oldest congregation. Some older synagogue buildings have been in continuous use as synagogues, while others have been converted to other purposes, and a few, such as the Touro Synagogue, were shuttered for many decades. Some early established congregations have been in continuous existence, while other early congregations have ceased to exist.

== Oldest congregations ==
=== Sephardi congregations ===
All of the oldest congregations in the new world were founded by Sephardi Jews and followed the Sephardic liturgy.

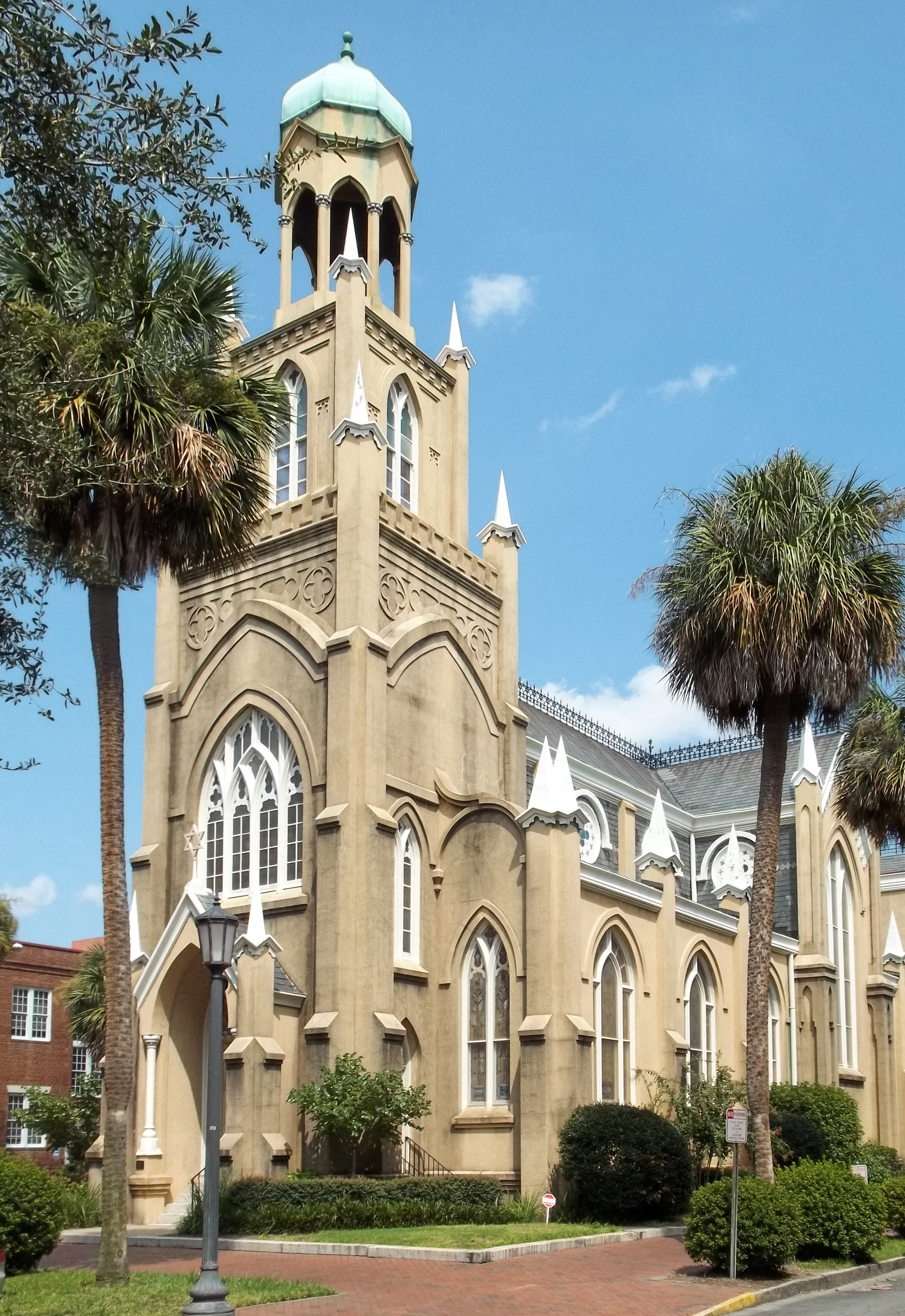
Congregation Mickve Israel, Savannah, Georgia (founded 1733, built 1876–78)

- Congregation Shearith Israel, founded in 1654, in New York City, is the oldest congregation in the United States. Its present building dates from 1896–97.
- Congregation Jeshuat Israel, founded circa 1658, in Newport, Rhode Island, is dated to sometime after the arrival of Jews in 1658 and prior to the 1677 purchase of a communal cemetery, now known as Touro Cemetery. In much of the nineteenth century, no Jews lived in Newport, and the ownership of the building and synagogue were entrusted to Congregation Shearith Israel. The building was reopened for the use of Ashkenazi Jews in 1883.
- Congregation Mickve Israel of Savannah, Georgia, was organized in 1733.
- Congregation Mikveh Israel of Philadelphia was organized in the 1740s.
- Kahal Kadosh Beth Elohim Synagogue, Charleston, South Carolina, was founded in the 1740s.
- Kahal Kadosh Beth Shalome, Richmond, Virginia, was founded in 1789. In 1898, it merged with Congregation Beth Ahabah, which was founded in 1841.
- The St. Thomas Synagogue in the United States Virgin Islands was founded in 1796.
- Nefutzoth Yehudah (Congregation Dispersed of Judah) in New Orleans, Louisiana, was founded in 1846. In 1881, it merged with the Ashkenazic congregation Shanarai-Chasset (Congregation Gates of Mercy) to form Touro Synagogue. The congregation joined the Reform movement in 1891.

=== Ashkenazi congregations ===
Until 1795, all documented congregations in the United States followed the Sephardic minhag. However, many included Ashkenazi members as well.

- There are a few references to an Ashkenazi Beth Elohim in Charleston prior to 1791, although this may have been a subgroup within the Sephardic Kahal Kadosh Beth Elohim rather than a fully independent congregation
- The first Ashkenazic rite synagogue in the US was founded in 1761 in Easton, Pennsylvania.
- Congregation Rodeph Shalom (Philadelphia, Pennsylvania), founded in 1795, is usually considered the oldest existing Ashkenazi congregation in the United States.
- K.K. Bene Israel in Cincinnati, Ohio, now known as the Rockdale Temple (1824) is the oldest congregation west of the Allegheny Mountains.
- B'nai Jeshurun in New York City, was founded in 1825.
- Shanarai-Chasset (Congregation Gates of Mercy) in New Orleans, Louisiana, was founded in 1828. In 1881, it merged with the Sephardic Nefutzoth Yehudah (Congregation Dispersed of Judah) to form Touro Synagogue in New Orleans. The congregation joined the Reform movement in 1891.

== Oldest existing buildings ==
This list includes only buildings originally built as synagogues that are still standing. Some continue in use as Jewish houses of worship; others have been adaptively reused. Fewer than 100 purpose-built synagogues constructed prior to 1900 remain standing. A portion of these are highlighted below.

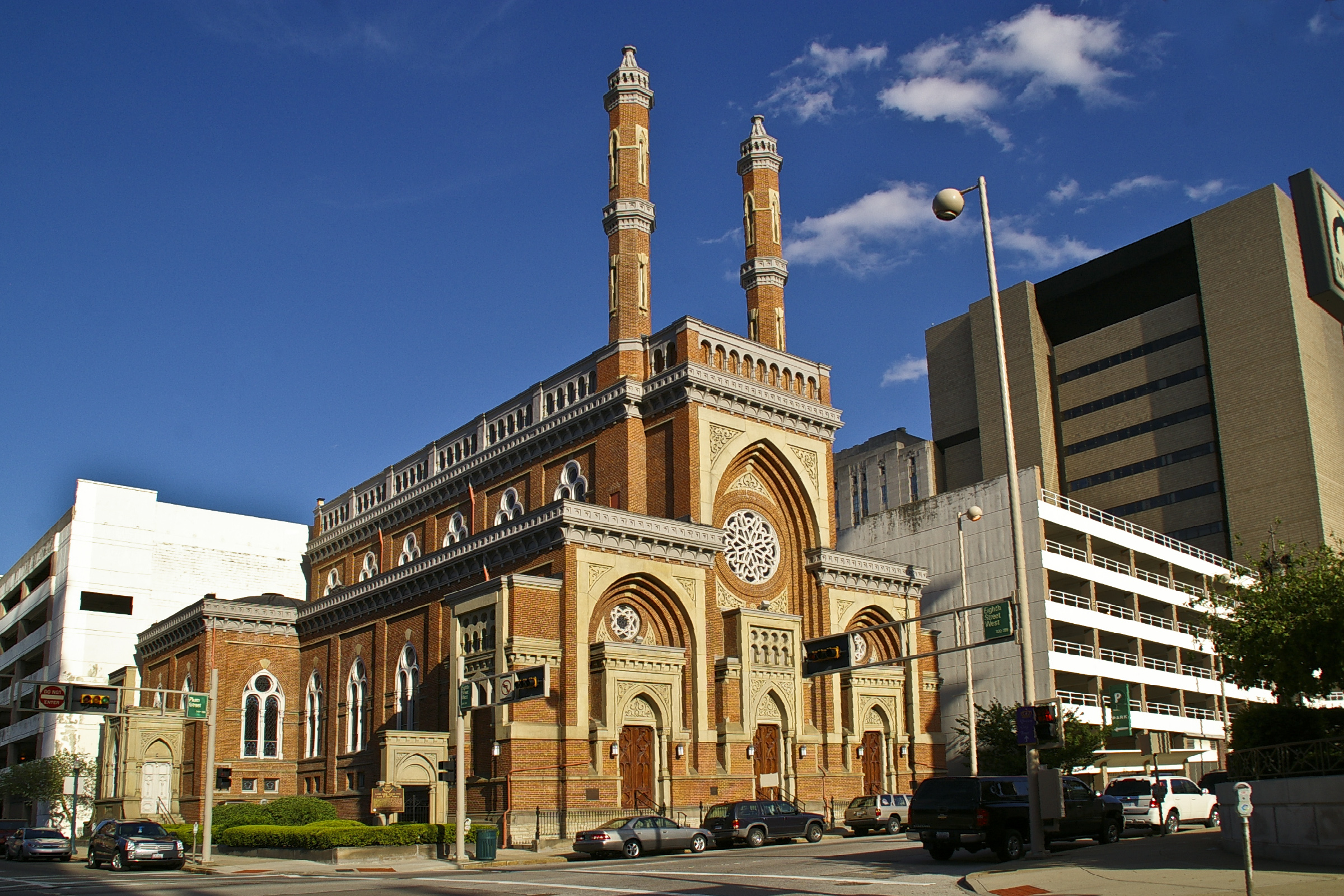
Plum Street Temple, Cincinnati, Ohio (1865–66)

- Touro Synagogue, Newport, Rhode Island (1759–63)
- St. Thomas Synagogue, United States Virgin Islands (1833)
- Kahal Kadosh Beth Elohim Synagogue, Charleston, South Carolina (1840–41)
- Congregation Mishkan Israel, Hamden, Connecticut (1840)
- Lloyd Street Synagogue, Baltimore, Maryland (1845)
- Angel Orensanz Center, New York, New York (1849–50)
- Congregation Rodeph Sholom, New York, New York, now Congregation Chasam Sopher (1853)
- Congregation Beth Israel (Honesdale, Pennsylvania) (1856)
- Sherith Israel Temple (Cincinnati, Ohio) (1860)
- Shaare Tefilah (Gates of Prayer), New Orleans, Louisiana (1860–65)
- Gates of Heaven Synagogue, Madison, Wisconsin (1863)
- Congregation Talmud Torah Adereth El, New York, NY (1864)
- Plum Street Temple, Cincinnati, Ohio (1865–66)
- B'er Chayim Temple, Cumberland, Maryland (1865–67)
- Temple Israel (Lafayette, Indiana) (1867)
- Congregation of B'nai Israel Synagogue, Augusta, Georgia (1869)
- B'nai Sholom Temple, Quincy, Illinois (1869–70)
- Congregation Berith Sholom, Troy, New York (1870)
- Congregation B'nai Israel, Galveston, Texas (1870)
- Central Synagogue, New York, New York (1870–72)
- Congregation Beth Israel (West Hartford, Connecticut) (1875–76)
- Temple of Israel (Wilmington, North Carolina) (1875–76)
- B'nai Israel Synagogue (Baltimore, Maryland) (1876)
- Union Temple, Brooklyn, New York (1876)
- Adas Israel Congregation, Washington, D.C. (now Lillian & Albert Small Jewish Museum) (1876)
- Congregation Mickve Israel, Savannah, Georgia (1876–78)
- Temple Adath Israel (Owensboro, Kentucky) (1877)
- Congregation Beth Israel (Charlottesville, Virginia) (1882)
- Congregation Adas Emuno, Hoboken, New Jersey (1883)
- Temple Beth El, Jefferson City, Missouri (1883)
- Prince Street Synagogue, Newark, New Jersey (1884)
- Temple Israel, Leadville, Colorado (1884)
- Ohavi Zedek, Burlington, Vermont (1885)
- Congregation Beth Emeth, Albany, New York (1887–89)
- Temple Aaron, Trinidad, Colorado (1888–89)
- Temple Beth Sholom (San Leandro, California) (1889)
- Congregation Beth Israel (San Diego, California) (1889)
- Moses Montefiore Congregation, Bloomington, Illinois (1889)
- Ahavas Sholem, Ligonier, Indiana (1889)
- Tifereth Israel, Alliance Colony, New Jersey (1889)
- Temple Beth Tefilloh (Brunswick, Georgia) (1889–90)
- B'nai Israel Temple, Salt Lake City, Utah (1890–91)
- Shaarai Shomayim (Lancaster, Pennsylvania) (1895–96)
- Ahavath Beth Israel, Boise, Idaho (1895–96)
- Rosenhayn Synagogue, Rosenhayn, New Jersey (c.1898)
- Temple B'nai Sholom (Huntsville, Alabama) (1898–99)

== By state ==
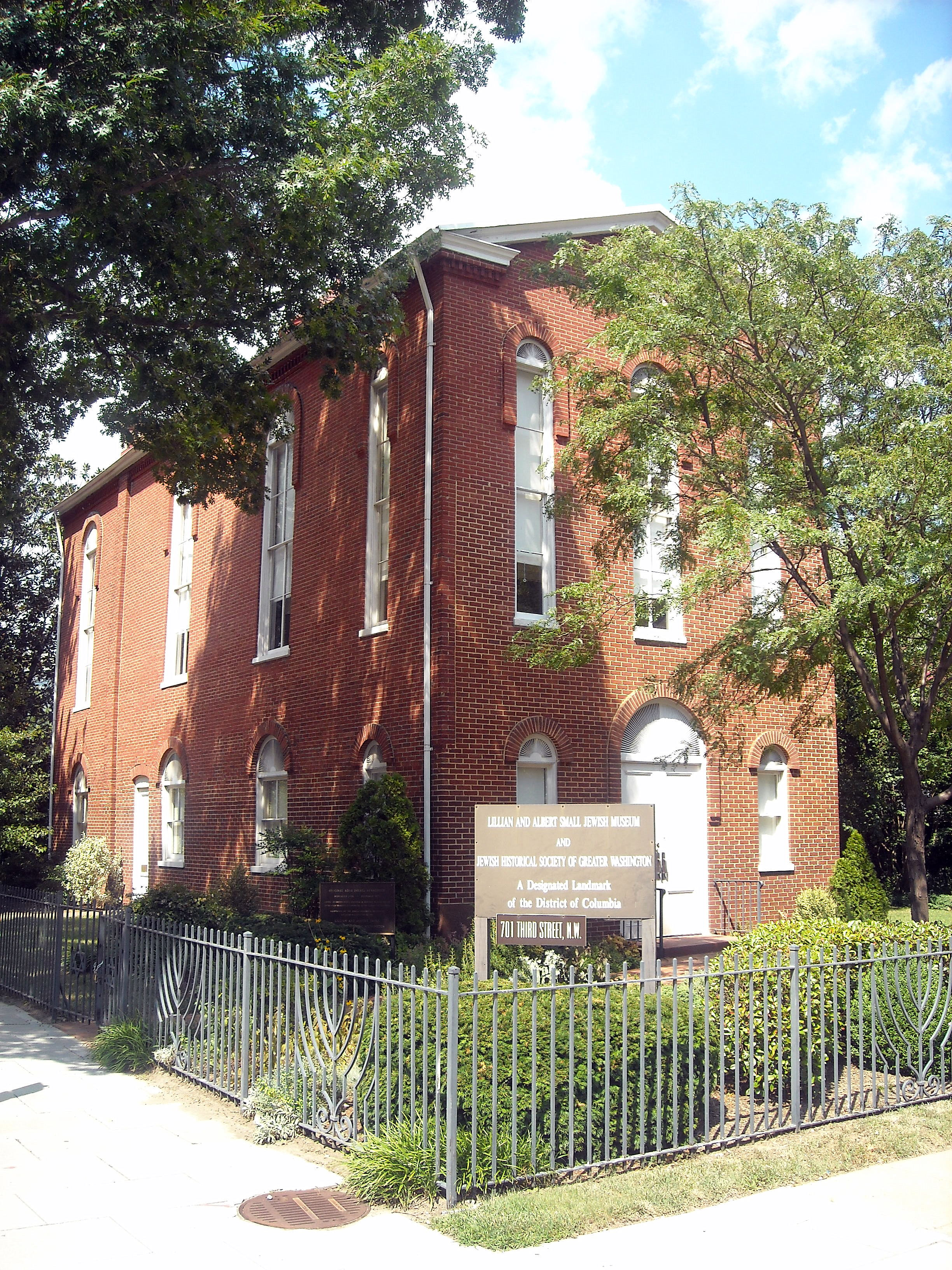
Adas Israel, Washington, D.C. (1876)

=== Alabama ===
- Congregation Sha'arai Shomayim, located in Mobile, the oldest congregation in Alabama, was formally organized on January 25, 1844. Their first synagogue was Emanuel Street Synagogue, dedicated on December 27, 1846. The current Springhill Avenue Temple is their fifth location.

=== Alaska ===
- Congregation Beth Sholom was first organized on September 5, 1958, in Anchorage.

=== Arizona ===
- Emanu-El dedicated the first synagogue in the Arizona Territory on October 3, 1910, in Tucson. The congregation stopped holding services there in 1949. The building is on the National Register of Historic Places and currently houses the Jewish Heritage Center of the Southwest.

=== Arkansas ===
- Congregation B'nai Israel was founded in Little Rock in 1866.

=== California ===
- Temple Israel (Stockton, California), founded 1851. Congregation has been in continuous existence, housed in four different locations over time.
- The two next oldest congregations in California are Emanu-El and Sherith Israel in San Francisco. Both were founded in 1851. The two synagogues were founded simultaneously because the city's Jews could not agree on whether to follow the prayer customs of the Polish or German Jews. Emanu-El was therefore founded as the congregation of the German Jews and Sherith Israel as the congregation of the Polish Jews.
- Congregation B'nai Israel (Sacramento, California) is the oldest congregation in Sacramento, California, tracing its history back to September 2, 1852, making it the first synagogue owned by a congregation west of the Mississippi River.
- Temple Emanu-El (San Jose, California), founded in 1861, oldest Jewish congregation south of San Francisco.
- Temple Sinai (Oakland, California), founded in 1875, oldest Jewish congregation in the East Bay (San Francisco Bay Area).
- Congregation Beth Israel (San Diego, California)'s 1889 building is the second oldest extant synagogue in California.
- Temple Beth Sholom (San Leandro, California)'s 1889 building is the oldest extant synagogue in California.

=== Colorado ===
- Temple Aaron in Trinidad, Colorado, built in 1889.
- Temple Emanuel in Pueblo, Colorado, built in 1900, is the city's oldest synagogue, according to the synagogue itself. The building is listed in the National Register of Historic Places.
- Temple Israel, Leadville, Colorado's 1884 building was restored as a synagogue and Jewish pioneer museum in 2008. The original congregation dissolved before 1914. The Hebrew Cemetery was established in 1880.

=== Connecticut ===
- Congregation Mishkan Israel (Hamden, Connecticut) was founded in 1840 in New Haven. Mishkan Israel and Congregation Beth Israel (West Hartford, Connecticut) were both incorporated in 1843, the year the Connecticut legislature first permitted public worship by Jews in the state.
- Temple Beth Israel (Hartford, Connecticut)'s 1875–76 building is the oldest in the state.

=== Delaware ===
- Adas Kodesch Shel Emeth in Wilmington, Delaware, is the oldest congregation in the state. It was formed from the merger in 1957 of the Orthodox Adas Kodesch Congregation, which was established in 1885, and the Chesed Shel Emeth Congregation. It is usually referred to simply as Adas Kodesch and is billed as "The First Synagogue in the First State".

=== District of Columbia ===
- Washington Hebrew Congregation, congregation founded in 1852.
- Adas Israel Congregation's original building, now known as the Lillian and Albert Small Jewish Museum, was built in 1876, after the congregation split from Washington Hebrew Congregation over the issue of organ music during services. Originally located at 6th and G Streets, the dedication was attended by President Ulysses S. Grant on June 9, 1876. The building has been relocated several times due to redevelopment and now sits at 3rd and F Streets NW.

=== Florida ===
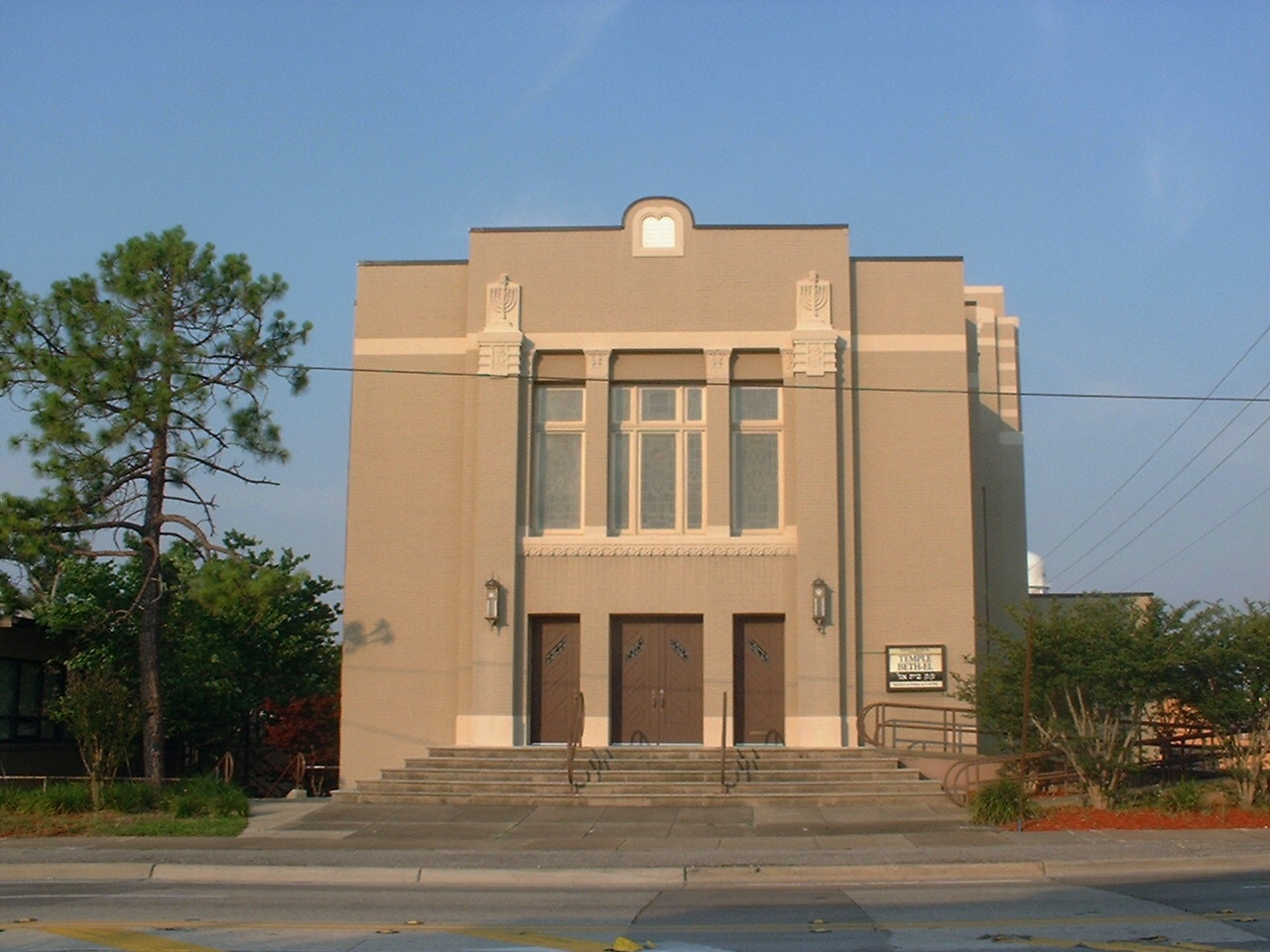
Temple Beth-El, Pensacola, Florida (1933)

- Ahavath Chesed in Jacksonville and Temple Beth-El in Pensacola both have claims to being the oldest Jewish congregation in Florida. The Jacksonville congregation was meeting for prayer by 1867, but appears to have incorporated later than Pensacola which dedicated its first building in 1876, well before Jacksonville's 1882 building. The current synagogue building in Pensacola opened in 1933.
- The United Hebrews of Ocala building was built in 1888. It is the oldest Florida synagogue building still standing. It is now the Ocala Bible Chapel, a Christian congregation.
- First Congregation Sons of Israel is the oldest synagogue in “The Nation's Oldest City”, St. Augustine, Florida. The congregation was chartered in 1908. The current synagogue building was dedicated in 1923. It is the oldest Florida synagogue building continuously used as a synagogue since construction.

=== Georgia ===
- Congregation Mickve Israel of Savannah, Georgia was organized in 1733.
- Congregation of B'nai Israel Synagogue of Augusta, Georgia, was organized in 1846, and its 1869 building is still present on Telfair Street in downtown Augusta and is currently being restored as the future home of the Augusta Jewish Museum.
- Temple Rodeph Shalom of Rome , Georgia was established in 1875. Its 1937 building is still present in downtown Rome and remains continuously active.
- Temple Beth Tefilloh of Brunswick, Georgia, was established in 1886, and its 1889–90 building was designed by Alfred S. Eichberg. Beth Tefilloh has been continuously active since its founding.

=== Hawaii ===
- Temple Emanu-El dates back to 1938 when 35 Jewish families on Oahu formed the Honolulu Jewish Community. In 1939, in cooperation with the Jewish Welfare Board, a small chapel on Young Street was leased and converted into a Jewish Community Center (JCC), which also served as Honolulu's first permanent synagogue.

=== Idaho ===
- Ahavath Beth Israel, Boise, Idaho (1895–96). The synagogue was built for Beth Israel, founded in 1895. In the 1980s, the congregation was formed as a merger of Congregation Beth Israel and Ahavath Israel, founded in 1912.

=== Illinois ===
- KAM Isaiah Israel merged several older congregations in Chicago. The oldest congregation of these was Kehillat Anshe Maariv, which was founded in 1847.
- Congregation Anshai Emeth, Peoria is a Reform congregation founded in 1859 and continuing to the present.
- Temple Beth-El of Northbrook was founded in 1871 in Chicago and was originally called Gemeinde Rodef Sholom. Temple Beth-El of Northbrook is now located in Northbrook, IL.

=== Indiana ===
- Congregation Achduth Vesholom of Fort Wayne was formed in 1848.
- Temple Israel (Lafayette, Indiana) was founded in 1849. Its 1867 building is the oldest in the state.

=== Iowa ===
- Temple Emanuel of Davenport was formed as B'nai Israel Congregation on October 21, 1861.
- B'nai Israel Congregation, Keokuk, Iowa. First permanent Jewish house of worship in Iowa, 1877.

=== Kentucky ===
- Congregation Adath Israel Brith Sholom, founded 1842, is the oldest congregation in Kentucky.
- Temple Adath Israel's 1877 building in Owensboro, Kentucky, is the oldest in the state.

=== Kansas ===
- Temple B'nai Jeshurun, founded in 1859, in Leavenworth, Kansas, is the oldest congregation in the state.

=== Louisiana ===
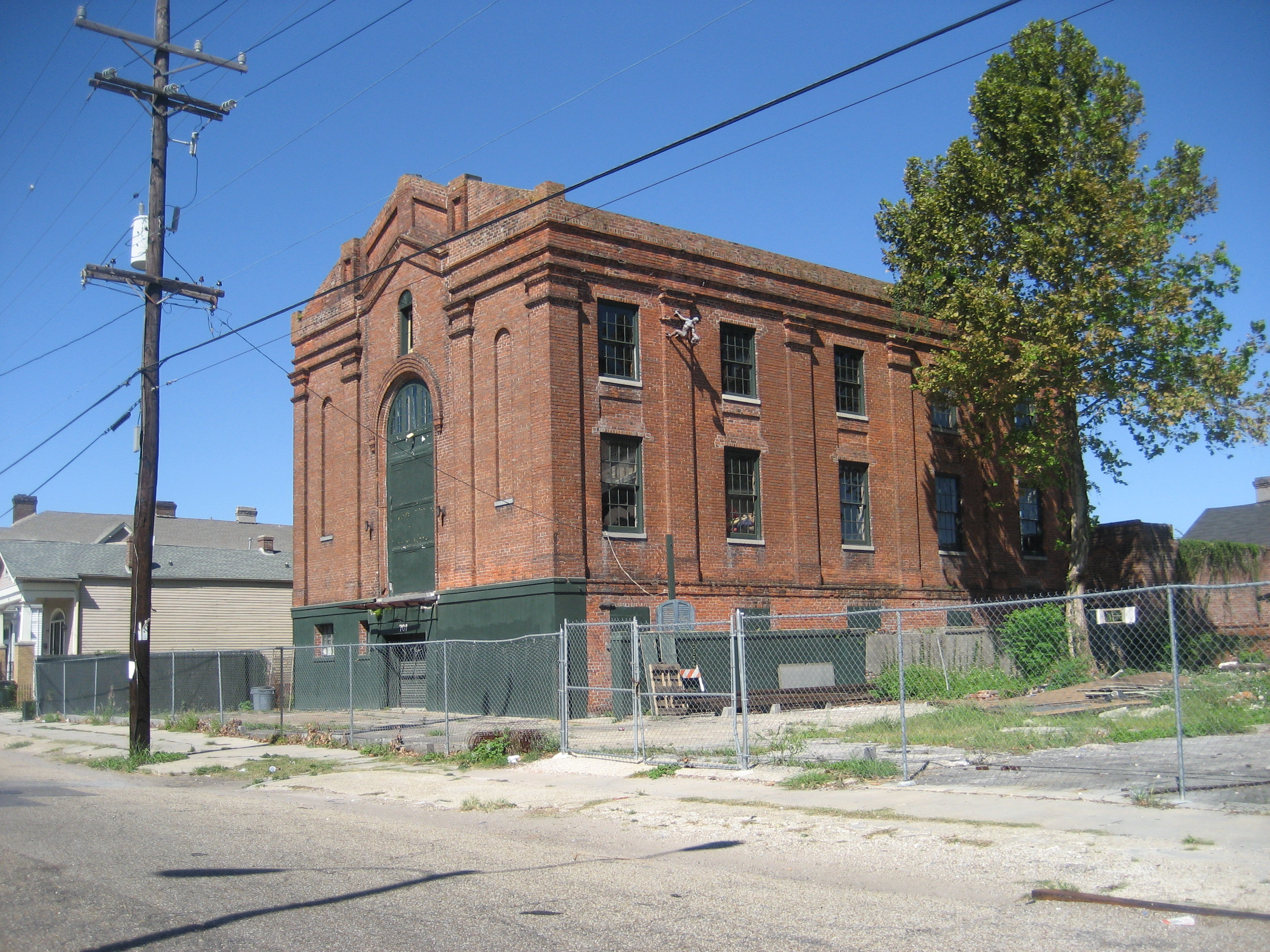
Shaare Tefilah, New Orleans, Louisiana (1860–65)

- Touro Synagogue in New Orleans, Louisiana, is the oldest congregation in the state. Touro Synagogue traces its origins back to Shanarai-Chasset (Congregation Gates of Mercy), which was founded in New Orleans in 1828.
- Shaare Tefilah (Gates of Prayer) in New Orleans, Louisiana, is the oldest surviving synagogue building in the state. Architect J. Thiele designed the brick structure to replace an earlier building, but construction was delayed by the Civil War. The synagogue was dedicated in 1865. The building is located at 709 Jackson Avenue in the Lower Garden District. The former synagogue had been converted to use as a storage facility; however, it was recently purchased and was converted to a 12-unit apartment building.
- Temple Sinai (New Orleans, Louisiana), the city's oldest Reform congregation, was established in 1870.

=== Maine ===
- Congregation Beth Israel of Bangor, formally organized in 1888, is the oldest congregation in Bangor and Maine.
- Congregation Shaarey Tphiloh is the oldest congregation in Portland, founded in 1904.

=== Maryland ===
- Baltimore Hebrew Congregation, incorporated in 1830, is the oldest congregation in Maryland.
- Congregation Shearith Israel (Baltimore, Maryland), founded 1851, remaining Orthodox since its founding.
- Lloyd Street Synagogue, located in Baltimore, is the oldest synagogue building in Maryland.
- B'er Chayim Temple in Cumberland was founded during the Civil War, and its current building was constructed in 1865–67. It is the oldest continuously operating Maryland synagogue.

=== Massachusetts ===
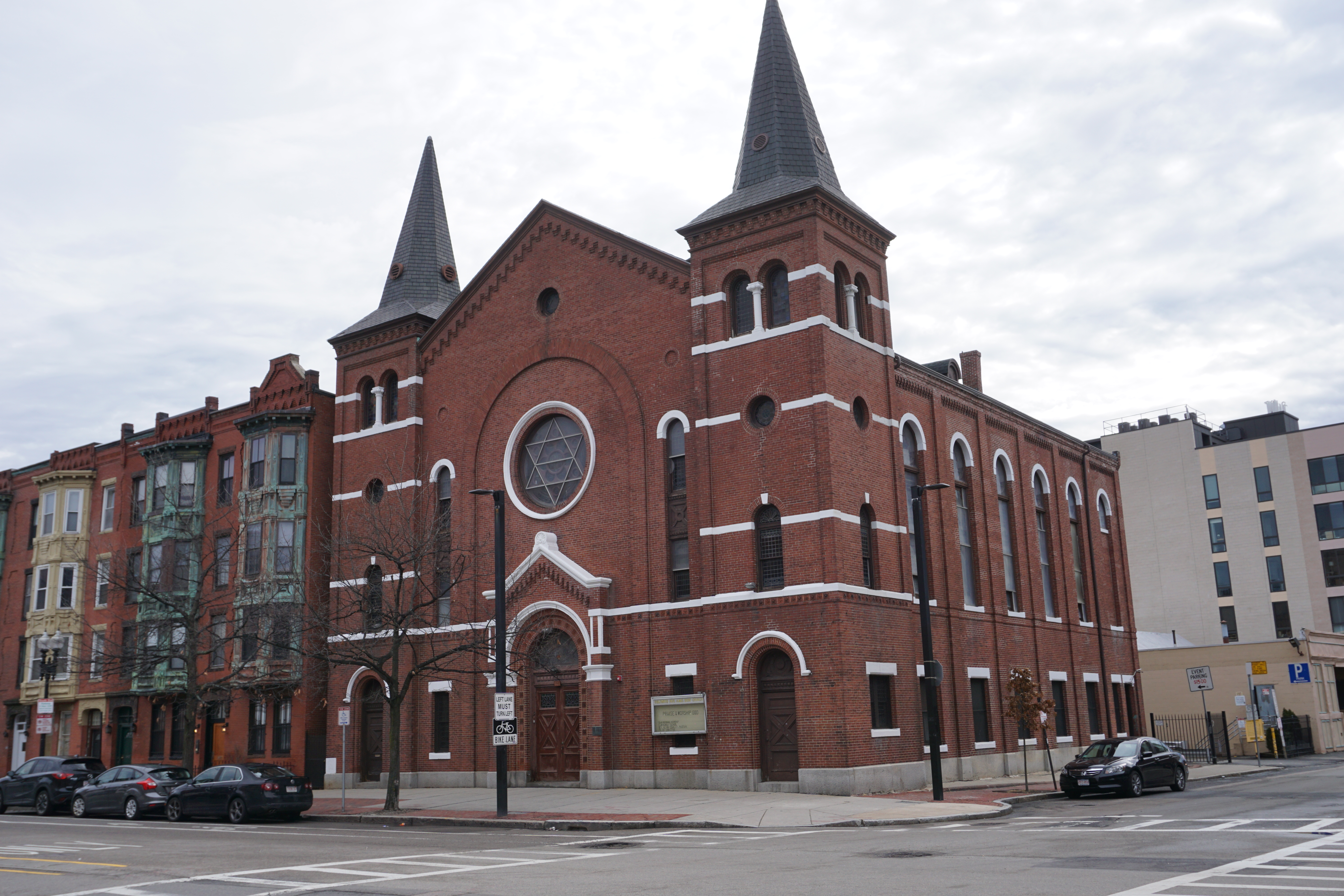
Temple Israel, Boston (1884–85)

- Ohabei Shalom, founded in 1843, is the oldest congregation.
- Temple Israel (Boston) constructed its 1884–85 building, now a church, that is now the oldest synagogue still standing in Massachusetts.
- Shaarai Torah, built in 1906, is the oldest synagogue building still standing in Worcester.

=== Michigan ===
- Temple Emanuel (Grand Rapids, Michigan) is the oldest extant synagogue building in the state (1881); the congregation was founded in 1857.

=== Minnesota ===
- Mount Zion Temple, organized in 1856 in St. Paul.

=== Mississippi ===
- B'nai Israel was organized in Natchez in 1843, making it the oldest congregation in Mississippi.
- An historic marker on the corner of South Street and South Main Street in Jackson marks the site of the first synagogue built in the state, Beth Israel, built in 1867. The building was destroyed by fire on July 10, 1874.
- Gemiluth Chessed (Acts of Loving Kindness) is a Moorish Revival synagogue in Port Gibson, Mississippi. It is the oldest surviving synagogue in the state, and the only building of this architectural style. It was built in 1892 by a community of Jewish immigrants from German states and Alsace-Lorraine. Due to declining population, the congregation closed in 1986.

=== Missouri ===
- United Hebrew Congregation, 1837, is the oldest congregation in Missouri and the oldest congregation west of the Mississippi River.
- Temple Beth El, Jefferson City has continuously operated in the same location and building since 1883.

=== Montana ===
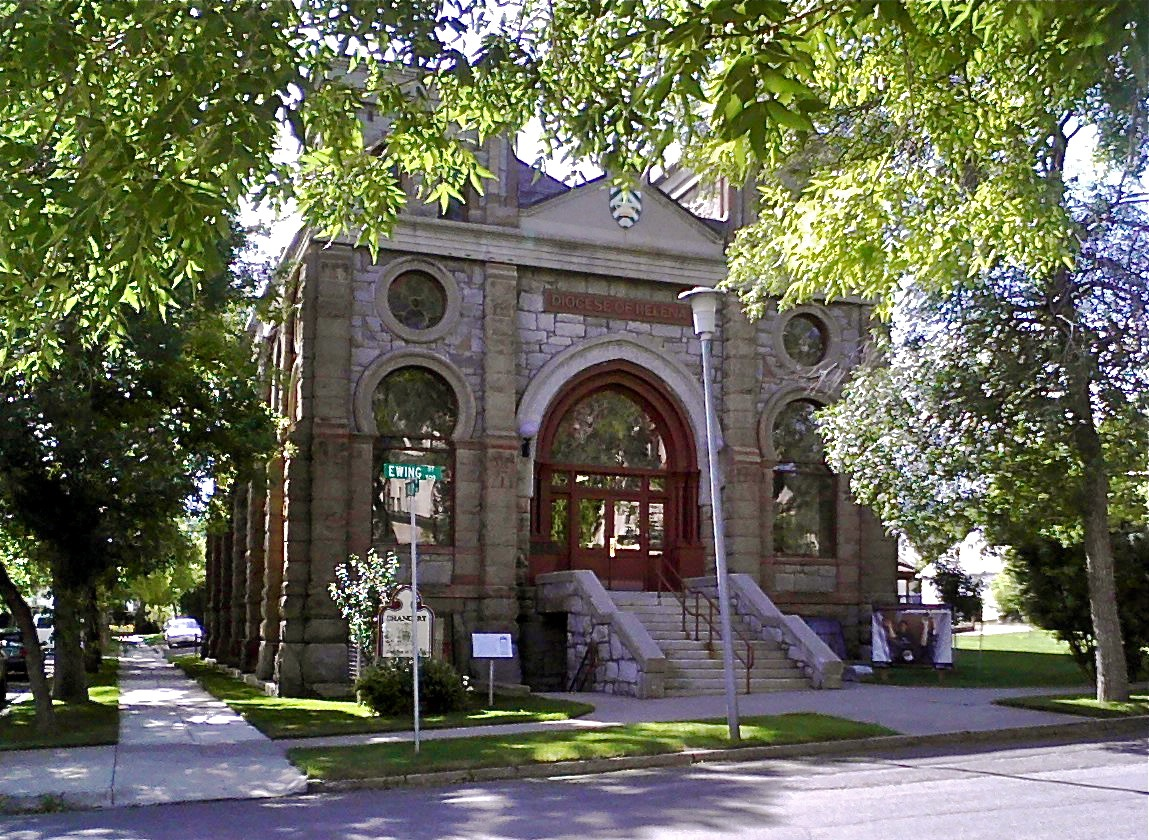
Temple Emanu-El, Helena, Montana (1890–91)

- Congregation B’nai Israel Temple in Butte, Montana was built in 1903.
- Temple Emanu-El (Helena, Montana) was built in 1890–91.

=== Nebraska ===
- Temple Israel of Omaha is the oldest congregation in Nebraska (1871).

=== Nevada ===
- Temple Emanu-El, Reno, Nevada, founded in 1922.
- Temple Beth Sholom, Las Vegas, Nevada, founded in 1931.

=== New Hampshire ===
- Temple Adath Yeshurun of Manchester, founded in 1891, is the oldest congregation in New Hampshire.
- Temple Israel, first permanent Jewish house of worship in New Hampshire, Portsmouth, 1910.

=== New Jersey ===
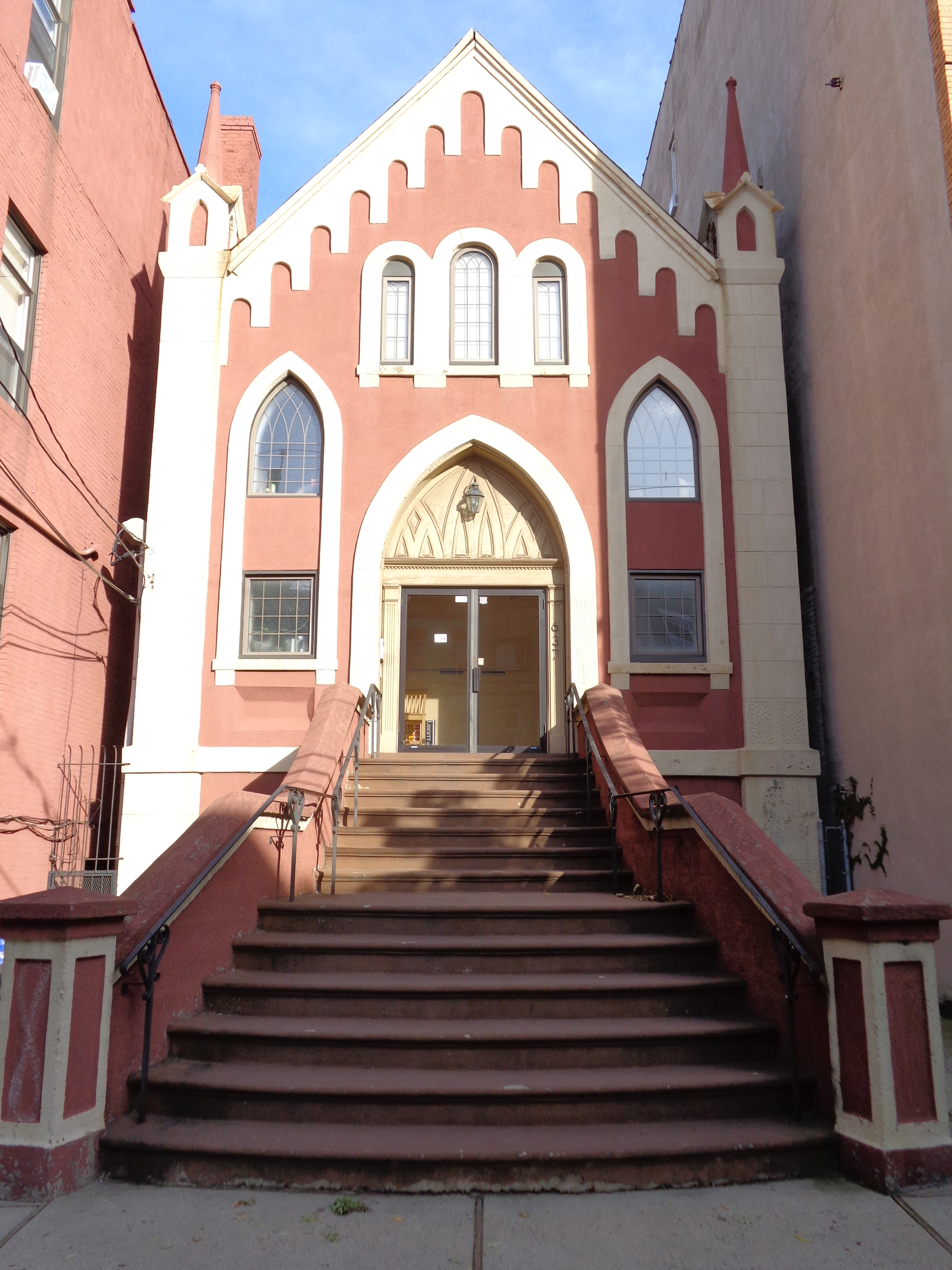
Building at 637 Garden Street, Hoboken, in Hudson County, built in 1883

- Congregation B'nai Jeshurun of the Town of Paterson, incorporated by the New Jersey Legislature on December 22, 1847. The congregation was later named The Barnert Temple in honor of a past-president and former Mayor of Paterson Nathan Barnert. In 1987, the congregation to Franklin Lakes.
- Congregation Adas Emuno (New Jersey)'s 1883 building in Hoboken is the oldest surviving synagogue building in New Jersey, although it is no longer used as a synagogue.
- Congregation B'nai Jeshurun was founded in 1848. Originally located in Newark, it is currently located in Short Hills, NJ.
- Har Sinai Temple was founded in 1857. Originally located in Trenton, it is currently located in Pennington, NJ.
- Anshe Emeth Memorial Temple, the fourth Jewish congregation founded in New Jersey, was established in New Brunswick on October 11, 1859 where it still functions today as the oldest temple in Middlesex county as well as the oldest synagogue in New Jersey to still be located in its city of origin.

=== New Mexico ===
- Congregation Albert, founded in 1897, is the oldest continuing Jewish organization in New Mexico.
- Congregation Montefiore, Las Vegas, N.M. was the first Jewish congregation in New Mexico; it was founded in 1884

=== New York ===
- Congregation Shearith Israel, founded 1654, Upper West Side, Manhattan, is the oldest congregation in New York and the United States.
- B'nai Jeshurun, founded 1825, the second Jewish congregation in New York City and the ninth in the United States, now located on the Upper West Side, Manhattan.
- Congregation Darech Amuno (variously spelled Darech Emunah and Darech Amino), Greenwich Village was established in 1838. The Orthodox congregation is also known as the Greenwich Village Synagogue and had a weekly Shabbat minyan at 53 Charles Street, New York, NY until 2020.
- Temple Society of Concord, founded 1839, Syracuse, New York.
- Angel Orensanz Center, 1849–50, Lower East Side, Manhattan, is the oldest synagogue building still standing in New York State.
- Central Synagogue was constructed in 1870–72.
- Orach Chaim, founded 1879, Upper East Side, Manhattan
- Congregation Anshe Emeth now known as Congregation Beth Emeth, was founded 1885, Albany, New York
- Congregation Ahavas Israel, founded 1886, Greenpoint, Brooklyn, also known as Greenpoint Shul
- Congregation Baith Israel Anshei Emes commonly known as Kane Street Synagogue, founded 1856 as the first synagogue in Brooklyn or on Long Island
- Beth Shalom v'Emeth Reform Temple (B'ShERT), founded as Temple Beth Emeth in 1911, is the last remaining Reform congregation in Brooklyn between Prospect Park and the Atlantic Ocean (Coney Island).
- Eldridge Street Synagogue, 1886–87, Manhattan, was the first grand house of worship built by Eastern European Jews
- Congregation Kneses Tifereth Israel, founded 1887, Port Chester, New York. The congregation first held services in the homes of founding members until a building was purchased and designed by acclaimed architect Philip Johnson in 1953.

=== North Carolina ===
- The Temple of Israel in Wilmington was organized in 1872. It is the oldest congregation in North Carolina and one of the earliest Reform synagogues (built 1875–76) in the South.

=== North Dakota ===
- B'nai Israel Synagogue and Montefiore Cemetery was founded c.1888.

=== Ohio ===
- The Rockdale Temple (1824), originally known as K.K. Bene Israel in Cincinnati, is not only the oldest congregation in Ohio, it is the oldest congregation west of the Allegheny Mountains and the second oldest Ashkenazi congregation in the United States.
- Sherith Israel Temple, also in Cincinnati (1860), is the oldest synagogue structure west of the Alleghenies.

=== Oklahoma ===
- Temple Emeth in Ardmore was the oldest known Jewish congregation in Oklahoma. Founded prior to statehood, they acquired their first building in 1912. The congregation disbanded in 2004.
- Temple B'nai Israel was formed in May 1903 in Oklahoma City, making it the oldest active congregation in Oklahoma.

=== Oregon ===
- Congregation Beth Israel (Portland, Oregon), founded in 1858.

=== Pennsylvania ===
- Congregation Mikveh Israel in Philadelphia was founded in the 1740s. It was the fourth congregation founded in the future United States and the second oldest in continuous operation.
- Congregation Rodeph Shalom in Philadelphia was founded in 1795 and is the oldest Ashkenazi congregation in the Western Hemisphere.
- Reform Congregation Keneseth Israel, founded in 1847, was the sixth Reform Jewish synagogue founded in the United States. (Rodeph Shalom is now Reform but was originally Orthodox).
- Congregation Beth Israel (Honesdale, Pennsylvania)'s building was constructed in 1856 and is the oldest purpose-built synagogue in Pennsylvania that is still in use.

=== Puerto Rico ===
- Sha'are Zedeck, built in 1952, is the oldest synagogue in Puerto Rico.

=== Rhode Island ===
- The Touro Synagogue in Newport, founded c.1658, is the oldest Jewish house of worship in North America that is still standing. It was built in 1759–63.

=== South Carolina ===
- Kahal Kadosh Beth Elohim Synagogue in Charleston was started in 1749.

=== South Dakota ===
- Mount Zion Congregation, Sioux Falls, possibly the oldest congregation, ca. 1903

=== Tennessee ===
- The 1882 building of Temple Adas Israel, Brownsville, is the oldest synagogue building in Tennessee.
- First permanent Jewish congregation in Tennessee, Children of Israel, 1858 in Memphis. Originally known as Congregation B'nai Israel-Children of Israel, Temple Israel (Memphis) was formed by 36 German Jewish families in 1853 and chartered by the state of Tennessee on March 2, 1854.
- Congregation Ohabai Sholom (The Temple) in Nashville, had its beginnings in the late 1840s when a group of Jewish residents met for religious services. The synagogue lists its beginning year as 1851, when a benevolent society purchased cemetery property. It began as Khal Kodesh Mogen David and received a charter on March 2, 1854.

=== Texas ===
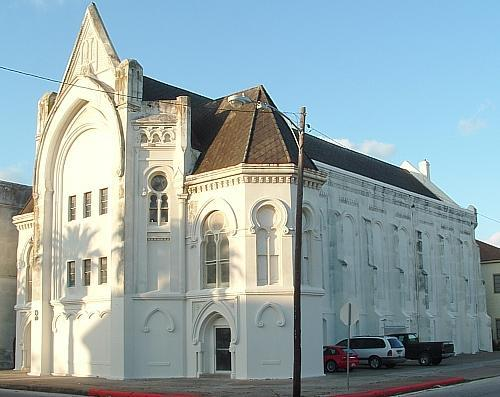
B'nai Israel, Galveston, Texas (1870)

- Temple Beth Israel (Houston, Texas), founded in 1854, is the oldest congregation in the state.
- The 1870 building of Congregation B'nai Israel (Galveston, Texas) is the oldest synagogue building in Texas. It was rebuilt c.1890.
- Temple Beth-El (San Antonio, Texas), founded in 1874, is the oldest congregation in South Texas.
- Congregation Beth Israel (Austin, TX) founded 1876. First congregation to receive a charter from the Texas Leislature.
- B'nai Abraham Synagogue (Brenham, Texas), founded in 1885.

=== Utah ===
- B'nai Israel Temple in Salt Lake City was the first permanent Jewish house of worship in Utah, founded in 1883.

=== Vermont ===
- Ohavi Zedek ("Lovers of Justice"), the first synagogue built in Burlington, Vermont, started by 18 people in 1885.

=== Virginia ===
- Beth El Hebrew Congregation, Alexandria, VA was established in 1859.
- Kahal Kadosh Beth Shalome, Richmond, founded in 1789 was the first congregation in Virginia and the sixth oldest in the United States. It merged with Congregation Beth Ahabah in 1898.
- Congregation Beth Ahabah, Richmond was founded in 1841 as the oldest Reform congregation in Virginia. It merged with Kahal Kadosh Beth Shalome, founded 1789, in 1898. The consolidated congregation dates its founding to 1789.
- Congregation Beth Israel (Charlottesville, Virginia) was founded in 1882. Its building is the oldest synagogue in the state.
- Temple House of Israel, Staunton, Virginia, founded in 1876 under the leadership of Major Alexander Hart.

=== Washington ===
- Congregation Bikur Cholim Machzikay Hadath is the oldest synagogue in Washington state. It is in the Seward Park neighborhood of Seattle, Washington. The congregation was founded in 1891.
- Temple Emamu-El in Spokane was built in 1892 and later demolished. The congregation later merged with Keneseth Israel to form the present-day Temple Beth Shalom.
- In 1914, Sephardic Bikur Holim Congregation was established. It is open for three daily prayers, on every Sabbath and all holidays. The congregation's original members hail from the country of Turkey.

=== West Virginia ===
- Temple Shalom (Wheeling, West Virginia), congregation founded in 1849.

=== Wisconsin ===
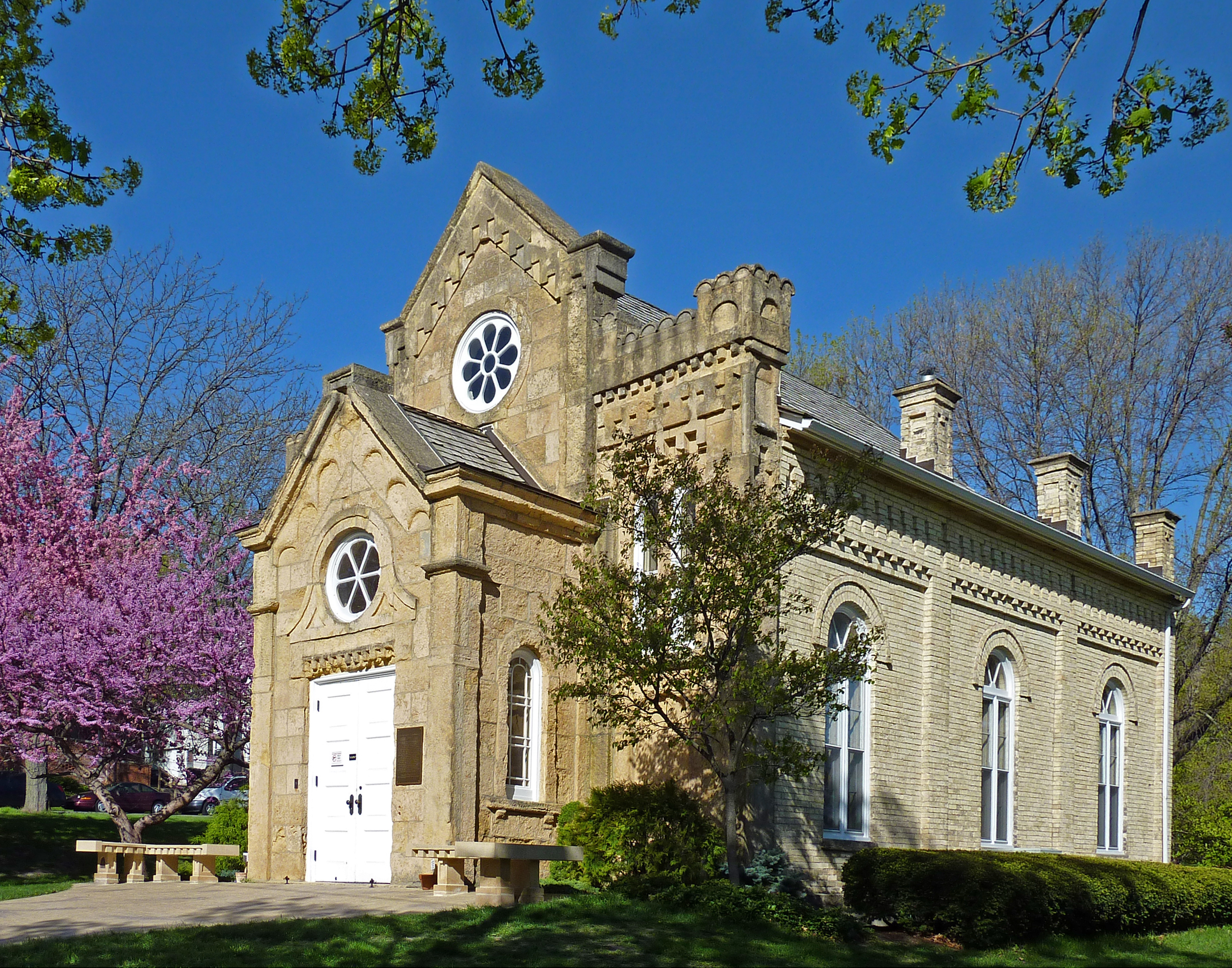
Gates of Heaven, Madison, Wisconsin (1863)

- The 1863 Gates of Heaven Synagogue in Madison is the oldest synagogue building in the state and the ninth-oldest in the country. It was moved to James Madison Park in 1970 and is now owned by the city of Madison.
- Congregation Emanu-El B'ne Jeshurun of Milwaukee was founded in 1856 and is still running today.
- Anshai Lebowitz founded 1908

=== Wyoming ===
- Mt. Sinai Congregation, in Cheyenne, Wyoming, the oldest synagogue in Wyoming, built in 1910.

== See also ==
- Oldest synagogues in the World
- Oldest synagogues in Canada
- List of synagogues in the United States
