= Temple Beth El (Jefferson City, Missouri) =

Reform synagogue in Jefferson City, Missouri, United States

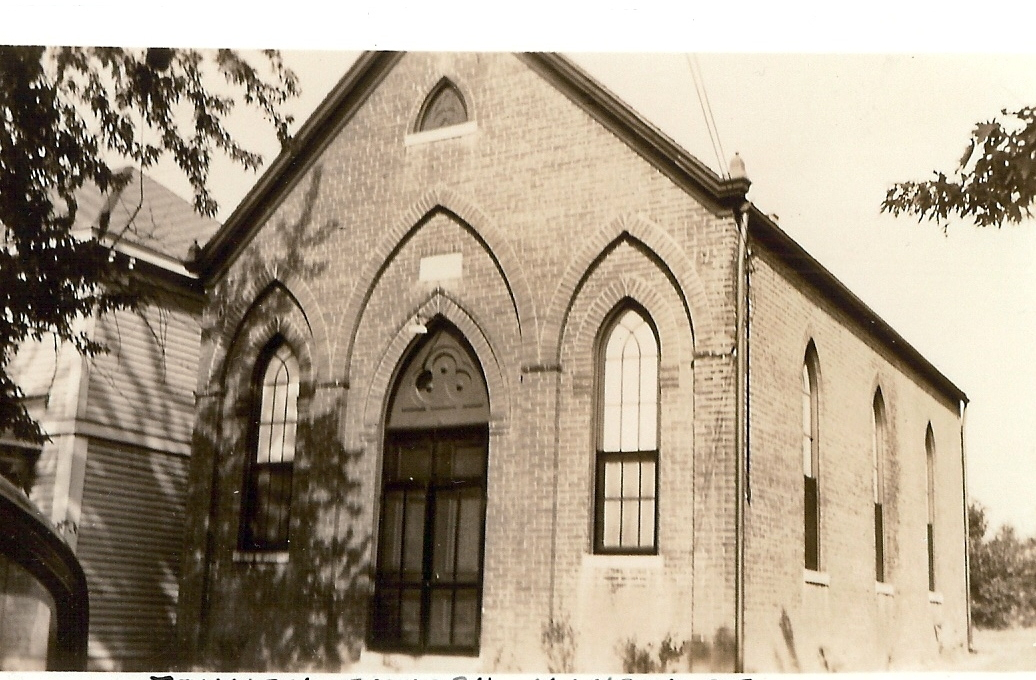
- Temple Beth El, c. 1920

- Location in Missouri

Religion
- Affiliation: Reform Judaism
- Ecclesiastical or organizational status: Synagogue
- Status: Active

Location
- Location: 318 Monroe Street, in Jefferson City, Missouri
- Country: United States
- Interactive map of Temple Beth El
- Coordinates: 38°34′28″N 92°10′15″W

Architecture
- Architect: Frank B. Miller
- Type: Synagogue
- Style: Gothic Revival
- Established: c. 1876 (as a congregation)
- Completed: 1883

Website
- templebethel-jc.org

Temple Beth El is a Reform Jewish synagogue located at 318 Monroe Street, in Jefferson City, Missouri, in the United States. Built in 1883 it has been in continuous use at that location since its construction. Shabbat services are led by members of the congregation every Friday night, and holiday services are also observed. The congregation is affiliated with Union for Reform Judaism. Temple Beth El is the oldest synagogue building in use west of the Mississippi.

== History ==
The Jewish congregation of Jefferson City built for themselves a synagogue on the west side of Monroe Street between High and McCarty in 1883. The building is 38 by 25 feet (11.6 m × 7.6 m) and constructed of brick and cut stone trimmings. The interior is neatly furnished and includes a Torah scroll handwritten on parchment. The original Torah written in 1811 is still in use today. The Temple was designed by prominent local architect, Frank B. Miller, who also designed the Cole County Courthouse and Central Missouri Trust Company. A plaque was placed in the building by the 12 founders in appreciation of women in the Hebrew Ladies Sewing Society who "by untiring exertion and labor have secured and presented to the congregation a house and a lot dedicated to the service of the most high." The wording on the plaque is noteworthy because the women are listed by their first names, which was unusual for the time.

Most of the early members of the congregation were merchants with stores on High Street selling clothing, shoes, and saddles including the Globe Shoe and Clothing Store, Straus Saddlery, Goldman Clothing Store, The Reliable Store, Czarlinsky's and later Herman's Department Store and Leeds.

On September 19, 1954, Temple Beth El hosted Missouri's ceremonies during the tercentenary of the first Jewish settlement in North America. Governor Phil Donnelly signed a proclamation recognizing the event in October 1957.

Temple Beth El is located within the downtown Missouri State Capitol Historic District.

== Gallery ==
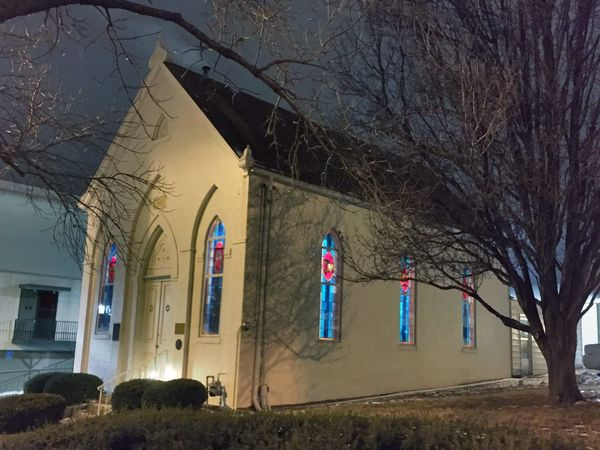
Temple Beth El

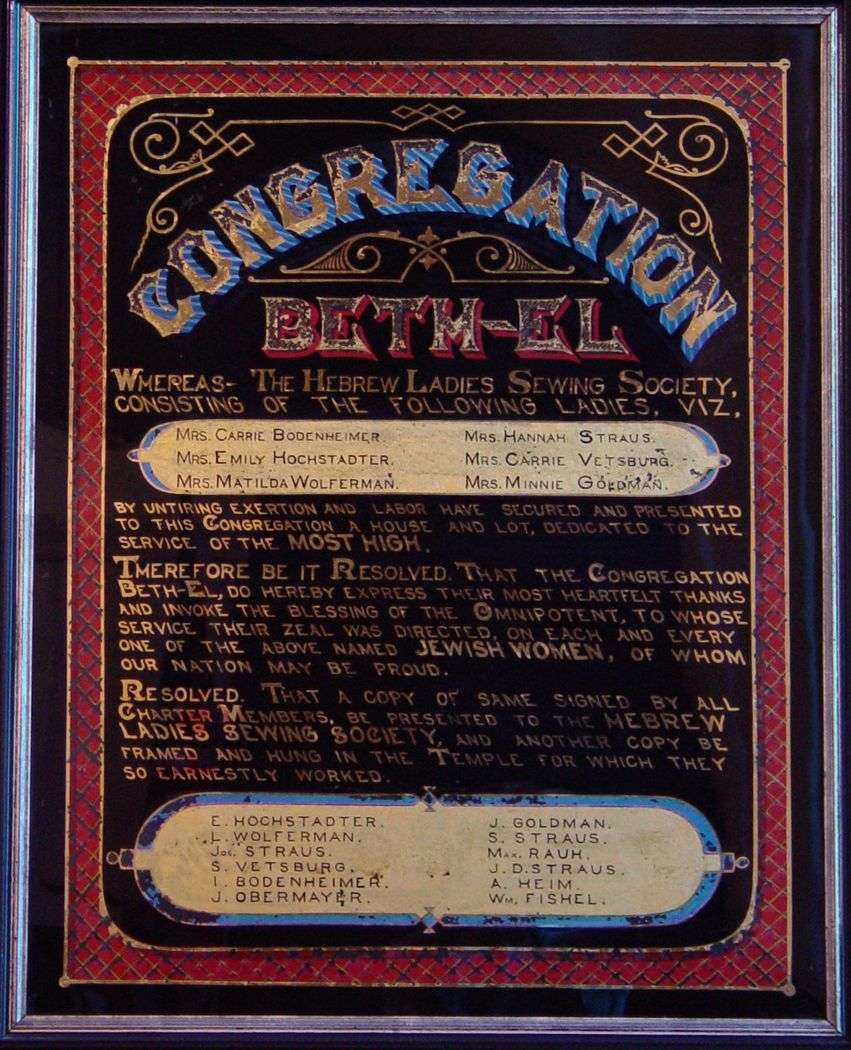
Original plaque listing founding members of Temple Beth El

== See also ==
- List of the oldest synagogues in the United States
