= Temple Aaron =

Historic synagogue in Trinidad, Colorado, US

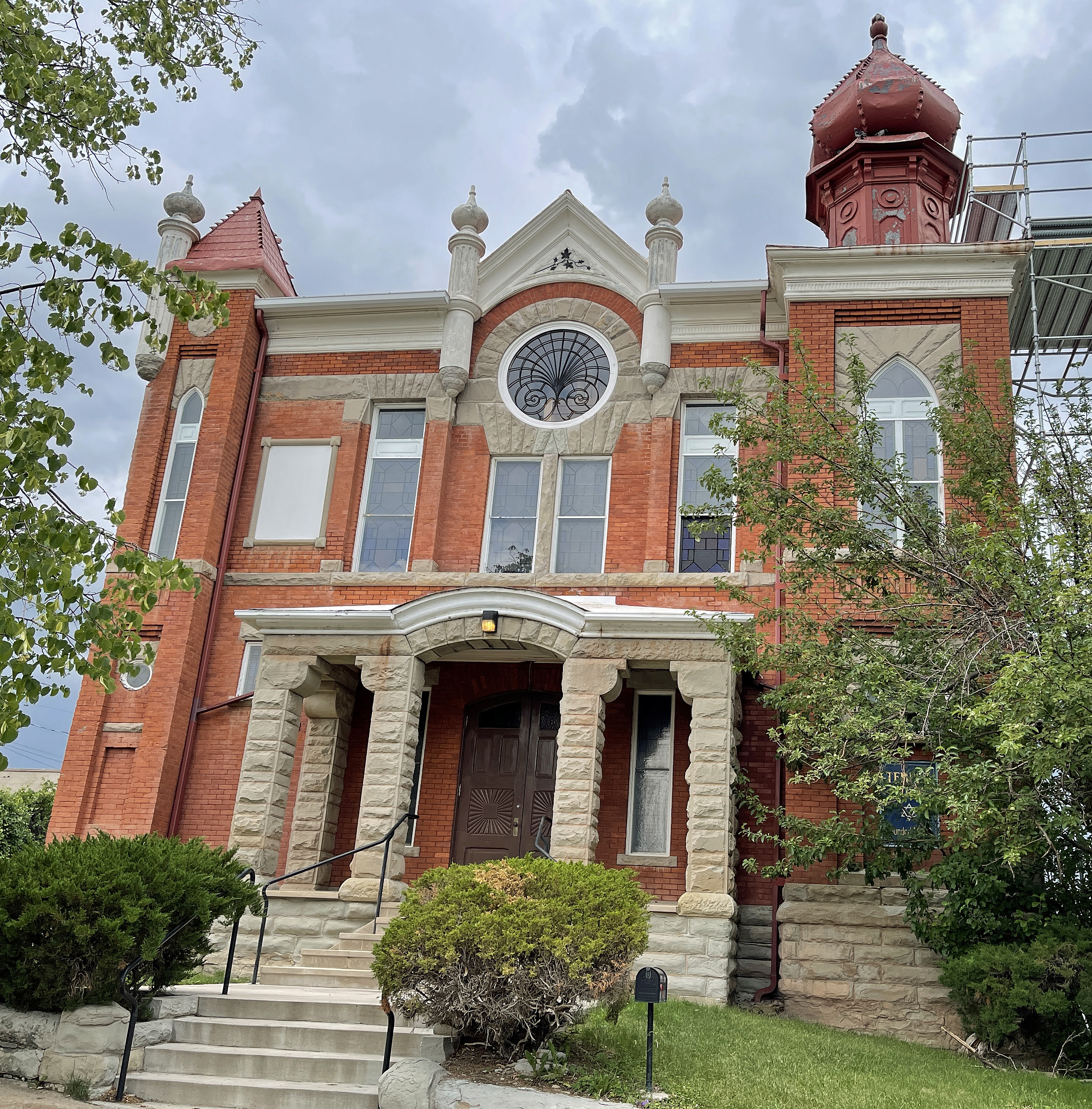
- The synagogue, in 2021

- Location in Colorado Temple Aaron (the United States)

Religion
- Affiliation: Reform Judaism
- Ecclesiastical or organizational status: Synagogue
- Ownership: Temple Aaron of Colorado
- Status: Active

Location
- Location: Trinidad, Colorado
- Country: United States
- Interactive map of Temple Aaron
- Coordinates: 37°09′59″N 104°30′11″W

Architecture
- Architects: Isaac Rapp (Bulger & Rapp)
- Type: Synagogue architecture
- Style: Moorish Revival
- Established: 1883 (as a congregation)
- Completed: 1889

Website
- templeaaron.org
- Temple Aaron
- U.S. National Register of Historic Places
- U.S. National Historic Landmark
- U.S. Historic district – Contributing property
- Part of: Corazón de Trinidad historic district (ID73000482)
- NRHP reference No.: 100009802

Significant dates
- Added to NRHP: December 13, 2023
- Designated NHL: December 13, 2023
- Designated CP: February 28, 1973

Temple Aaron, officially Temple Aaron of Colorado, is a Reform Jewish congregation and synagogue, located at 407 South Maple Street, in Trinidad, Colorado, in the United States. Completed in 1889, the temple is among the oldest synagogues in the state, and one of the oldest west of the Mississippi River. It was designated as a National Historic Landmark in 2023, for its distinctive Moorish architecture and for its role in the westward migration of Jews.

== History ==
German-Jewish settlers founded the congregation in 1883, while the building was completed in 1889, designed by Isaac Rapp in the exotic Moorish Revival style. A restoration was completed in 2006. Architectural features of note include the onion dome at the top of its tower, a detail repeated in moulding at the roofline, and pointed-arch windows.

From its peak in 1917 with 250 regular members, the congregation slowly began to decline, until the synagogue ran out of endowed funding, and the congregation could not afford to maintain the building. In 2016, the synagogue was listed for sale for $395,000 and added to Colorado's most endangered properties list the following year. Over a number of years, funds were raised through a non-for-profit organisation that enabled the synagogue to be preserved.

In 1973 the temple was assessed as a contributing property in the National Register of Historic Places-listed Corazón de Trinidad historic district. On December 13, 2023, the United States Department of the Interior designated the temple a National Historic Landmark.

== See also ==
- List of National Historic Landmarks in Colorado
- List of the oldest synagogues in the United States
