= Temple Adath Israel (Owensboro, Kentucky) =

Reform synagogue in Owensboro, Kentucky, US

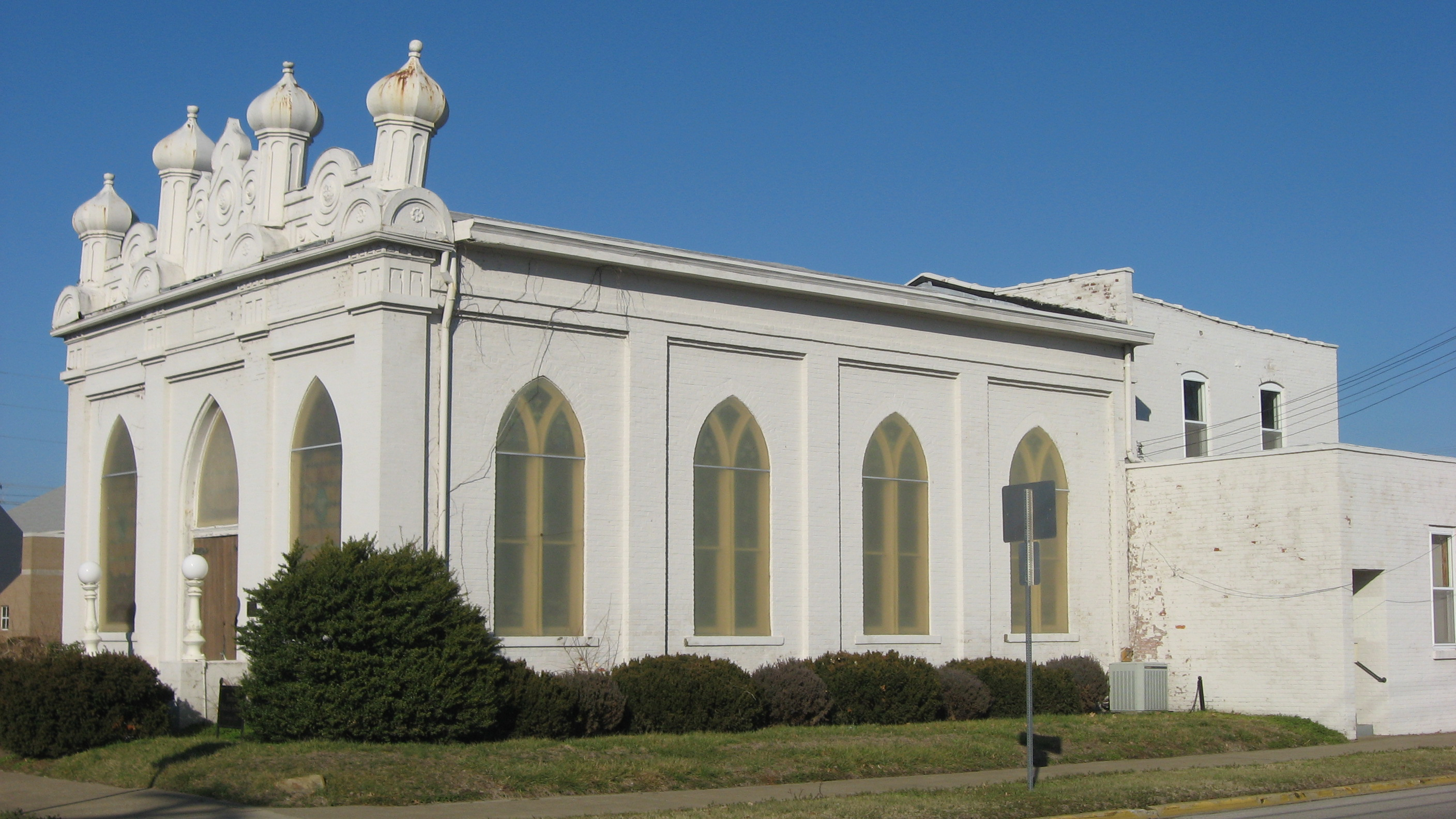
- Façade and southern side of the synagogue

- Location in Kentucky

Religion
- Affiliation: Reform Judaism
- Ecclesiastical or organisational status: Synagogue
- Leadership: Lay-led
- Status: Active

Location
- Location: 429 Daviess Street, Owensboro, Kentucky
- Country: United States
- Coordinates: 37°46′18″N 87°6′34″W

Architecture
- Type: Synagogue
- Style: Moorish Revival
- Established: 1858 (as a congregation)
- Completed: 1878
- Construction cost: $8,000

Specifications
- Capacity: 200 worshippers
- Dome: Four
- Materials: Brick

Website
- templeadathisrael.net
- Temple Adath Israel
- U.S. National Register of Historic Places
- Area: 0.2 acres (0.081 ha)
- MPS: Owensboro MRA
- NRHP reference No.: 86000761
- Added to NRHP: March 28, 1986

Temple Adath Israel (transliterated from Hebrew as "Congregation of Israel") is a Reform Jewish congregation and synagogue, located at 429 Daviess Street, in Owensboro, Kentucky, in the United States.

The congregation was formed in 1858.

Built in 1877–78, the Moorish Revival façade of the modest building features a Gothic Revival-arched door flanked by a pair of Gothic-arched windows punctuated by four pilasters. These are surmounted with molded capitals and fanciful embellishments. Originally the whole was topped by a parapet with a row of four small onion domed turrets. In June 2015, the parapet and onion domes were removed to save the roof from water trapped under the parapet.

The building was listed on the National Register of Historic Places in March 1986. It is among the oldest synagogue buildings in the United States.

== See also ==
- Oldest synagogues in the United States
