= Sherith Israel Temple (Cincinnati, Ohio) =

Synagogue in Cincinnati, Ohio, US

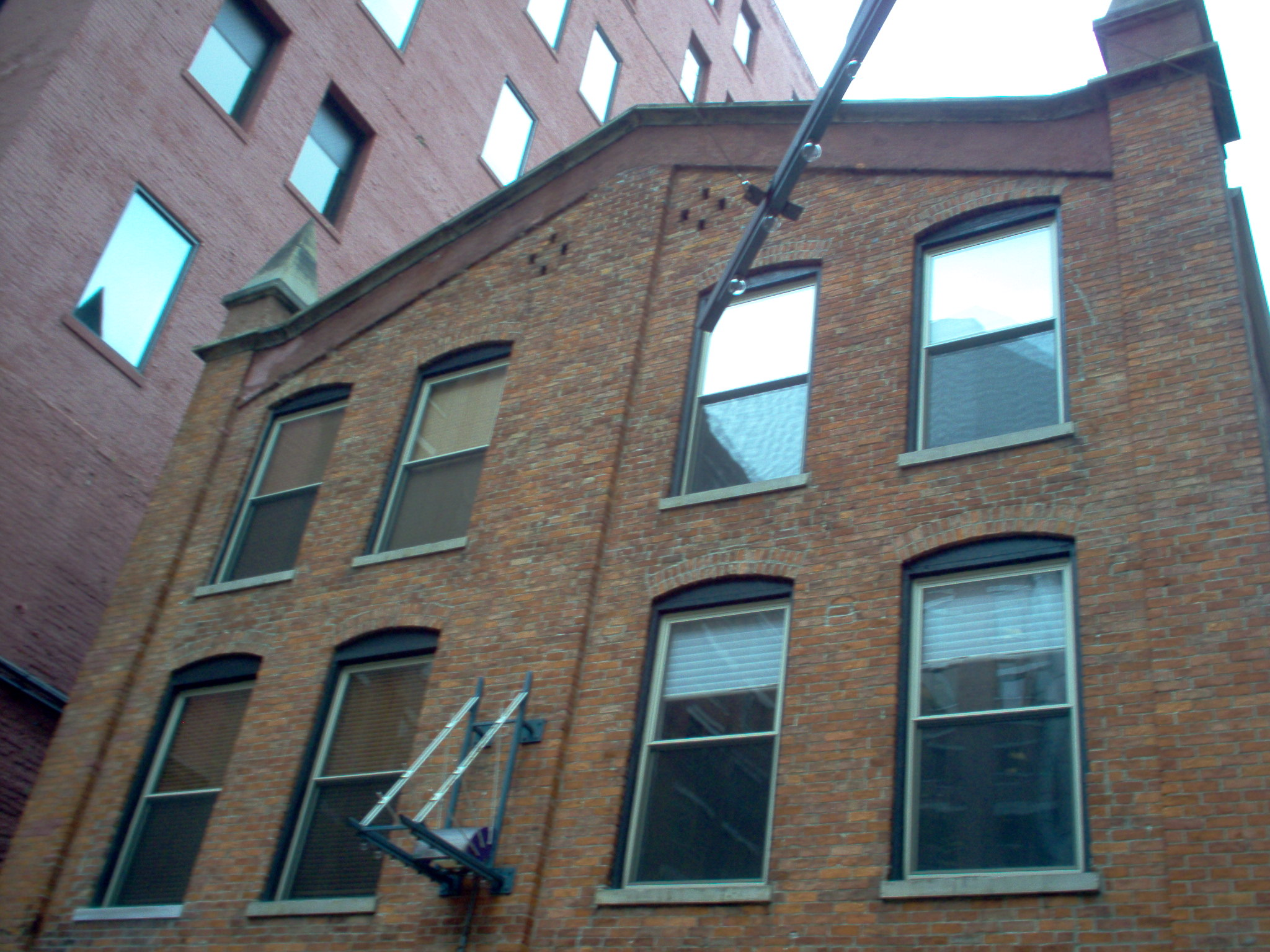
- The former synagogue, now condominia, in 2007

- Location of the former synagogue in Ohio

Religion
- Affiliation: Orthodox Judaism (former)
- Ecclesiastical or organisational status: Synagogue (1860–1882); Commercial uses (1880s–2000s); Condominia (since 2003)
- Status: Active

Location
- Location: Cincinnati, Ohio
- Country: United States
- Coordinates: 39°06′12.3″N 84°30′45.6″W

Architecture
- Type: Synagogue architecture
- Established: 1855 (as a congregation)
- Completed: 1860

The Sherith Israel Temple is a former Orthodox Jewish congregation and synagogue, located at 624 Ruth Lyons Lane (originally Lodge Street), in the backstage entertainment district in downtown Cincinnati, Ohio, in the United States.

The former synagogue building is the oldest existing synagogue building west of the Allegheny Mountains and the fourth oldest building in downtown Cincinnati. It is the seventh oldest synagogue building in the United States.

== History ==
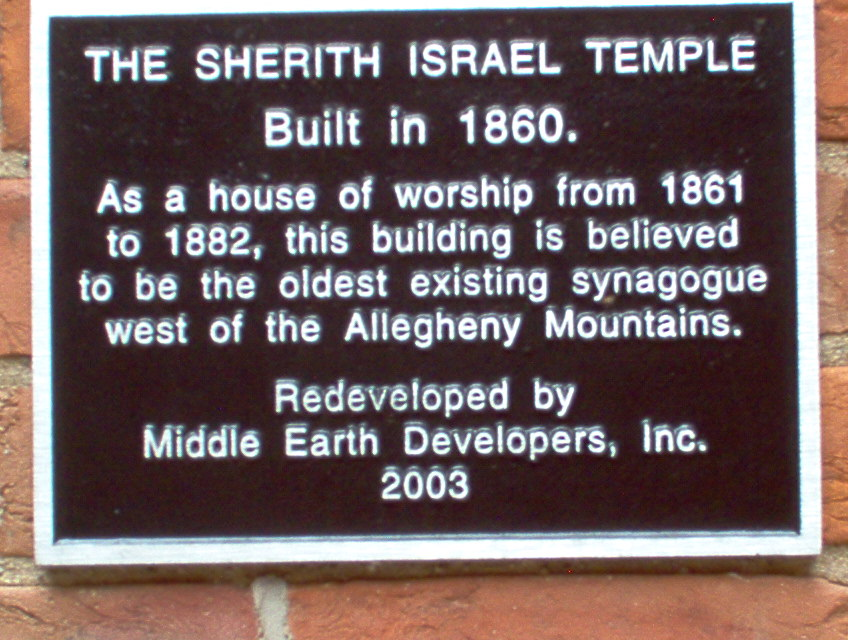

The congregation was founded in 1855 as an Orthodox congregation that objected to the Reform tendencies of the Rockdale Temple, then known as K.K. Bene Israel. The congregation merged with Congregation Ahabeth Achim in 1906.

The synagogue was built in 1860 and was an active synagogue until 1882. After that the building served as a warehouse, plumbing supply house, and machine shop.

Chris Cain, the city's historic preservation officer said, "This is a building of importance". Officials debated more than a year whether the building, once an Orthodox synagogue, should be saved. Despite the synagogue's history, the City officially decided in 1998 that the building should not be declared "historic".

The former synagogue was saved from demolition, renovated, and, since 2003, houses condominia.

== See also ==
- Oldest synagogues in the United States
