= Congregation Beth Israel (San Diego) =

Reform Jewish synagogue in San Diego, California, US

- Hebrew: בית ישראל
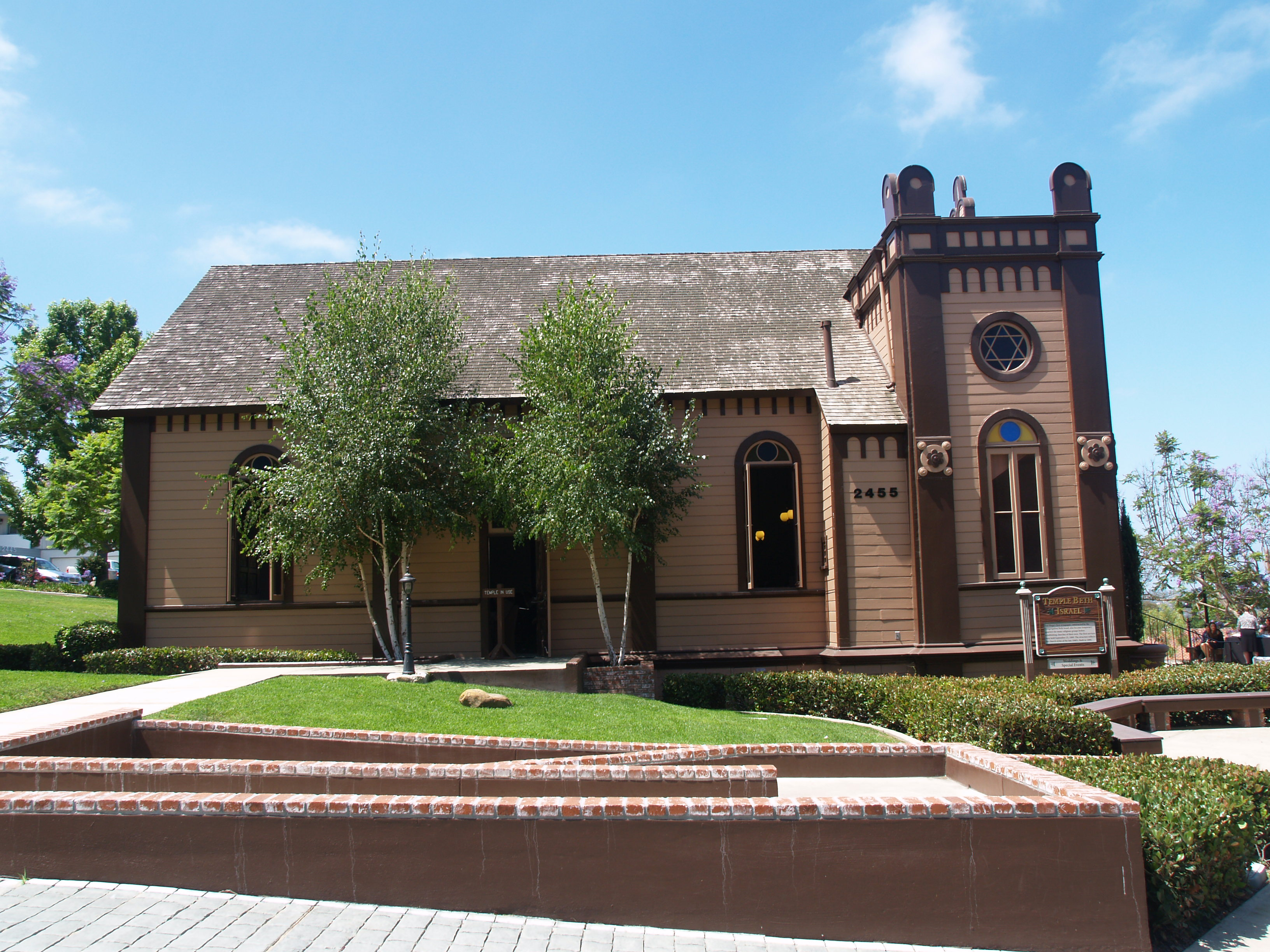
- The synagogue building, in

- Location in California

Religion
- Affiliation: Reform Judaism
- Ecclesiastical or organizational status: Synagogue
- Leadership: Rabbi Jason Nevarez; Rabbi Cantor Jeremy Gimbel; Rabbi Elana Ackerman-Hirsch (Assistant); Rabbi Arlene Bernstein (Cantor Emerita); Rabbi Michael Berk (Emeritus)
- Status: Active

Location
- Location: 9001 Towne Centre Drive, University City, San Diego, California 92122
- Country: United States
- Interactive map of Congregation Beth Israel
- Coordinates: 32°52′15″N 117°12′23″W

Architecture
- Type: Synagogue architecture
- Established: 1887 (as a congregation)
- Groundbreaking: 2000
- Completed: 1889 (Second Avenue); 1926 (Third Avenue); 2001 (University City)
- Site area: 3 acres (1.2 ha)

Website
- cbisd.org

Congregation Beth Israel (Hebrew: בית ישראל) is a Reform Jewish congregation and synagogue in University City, San Diego. Incorporated in 1887, Beth Israel traces its roots back to 1861 and is the largest and oldest Jewish congregation in San Diego.

== History ==
Jews first came to San Diego in 1850 and organized High Holiday services each year. In 1861, led by Marcus Schiller, they organized a congregation called "Adath Yeshurun". In early 1887, they formally incorporated under the name "Beth Israel".

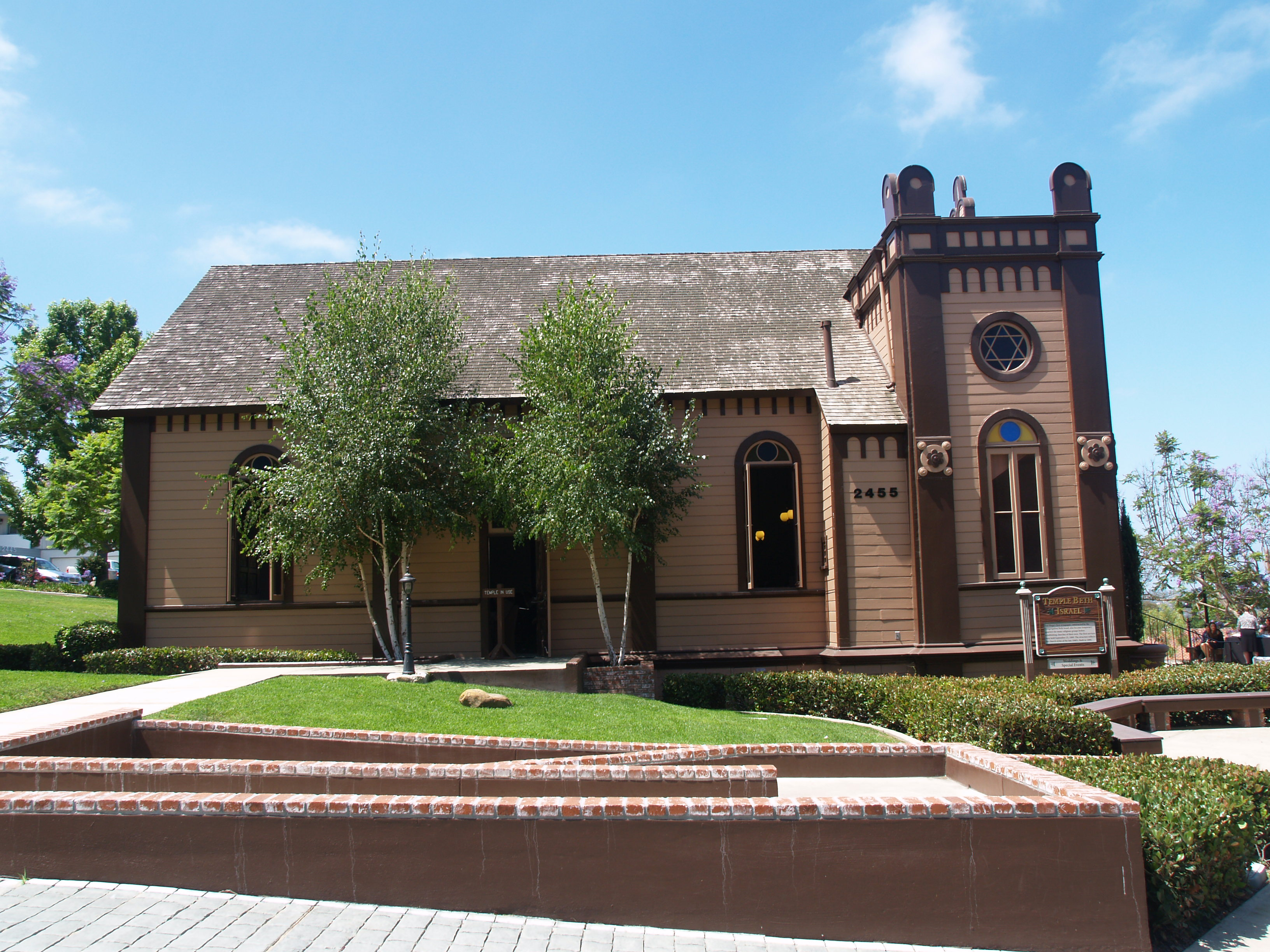
Temple Beth Israel's first synagogue building in Heritage Park in San Diego's Old Town area.

Beth Israel's first building still stands in Heritage Park, which is adjacent to Old Town San Diego State Historic Park. The wooden building was erected in 1889 at Second Avenue and Beech Street, in the wake of a boom in economic activity and population that resulted from the November 1885 completion of the California Southern Railroad connecting San Diego to the Atlantic and Pacific Railroad in Barstow, California. Services were first held there on September 25, 1889. One of the oldest synagogue buildings in the American West, it was used by the Congregation until 1926, when the Congregation moved to its second, larger building at Third and Laurel. At the time the congregation numbered around 60 families.

The Third and Laurel site occupied a full city block and included a number of structures. In addition to the synagogue building, there was an adjacent social hall, a school building, and a number of small apartments. When the congregation moved in early 2001, it retained the school and social hall.

Beth Israel purchased a 3-acre (1.2 ha) lot in University City in 1993. Construction on new facilities there began in January 2000 and were dedicated in October 2001. The site comprises five buildings totaling more than 65,000 square feet (6,000 m^{2}).

Jonathan Stein, who was Senior Rabbi at the synagogue, became Senior Rabbi at Temple Shaaray Tefila on New York City's Upper East Side.

== Current status ==
Beth Israel has over 2,000 members and nearly 1,100 households, making it San Diego's largest and oldest Jewish congregation. The clergy includes Senior Rabbi Jason Nevarez, Rabbi Cantor Jeremy Gimbel, Assistant Rabbi Elana Ackerman-Hirsch, and Rabbi Arlene Bernstein (Cantor Emerita). In June 2019, Senior Rabbi Michael Berk became Beth Israel's Rabbi Emeritus.

== Notable members ==
- Alan Bersin (born 1946), President Obama's "Border Czar," US Attorney for the Southern District of California, California Secretary of Education, Commissioner of US Customs and Border Protection, US Department of Homeland Security Secretary for International Affairs, and INTERPOL vice president.
- Louis Rose (1807–1888), pioneer developer of San Diego.
