= Temple B'nai Sholom (Huntsville, Alabama) =

Historic Reform synagogue in Alabama, US

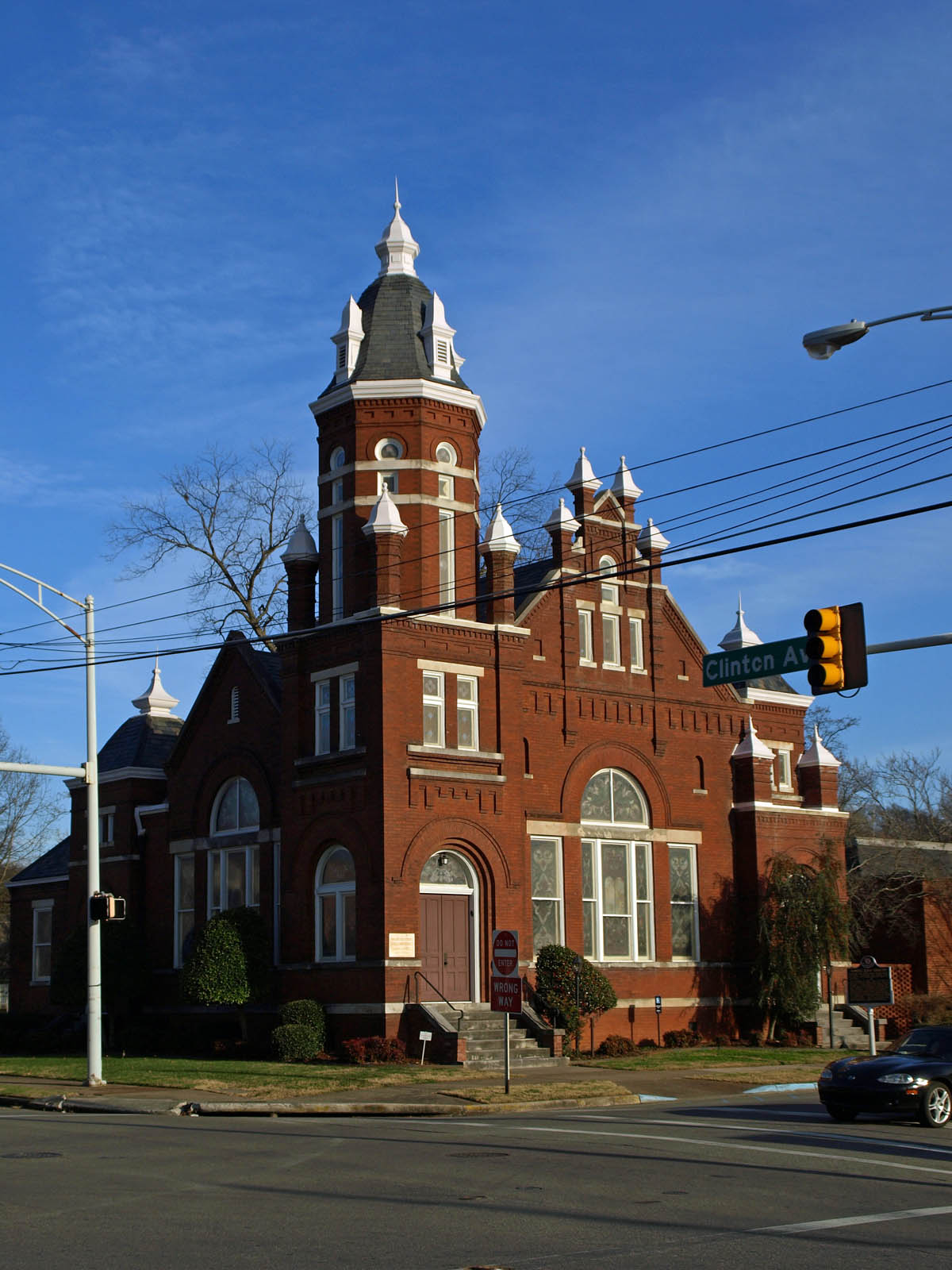
- The synagogue building, in 2009

- Location in Huntsville, Alabama

Religion
- Affiliation: Reform Judaism
- Ecclesiastical or organisational status: Synagogue
- Leadership: Rabbi P.J. Schwartz
- Status: Active

Location
- Location: 103 Lincoln Street SE, Huntsville, Alabama 35801
- Country: United States
- Coordinates: 34°43′58″N 86°34′59″W

Architecture
- Architect: R.H. Hunt
- Type: Synagogue architecture
- Style: Romanesque Revival
- Established: 1876 (as a congregation)
- Completed: 1899

Website
- templebnaisholom.org
- Temple B'nai Sholom
- U.S. National Register of Historic Places
- U.S. Historic district – Contributing property
- Alabama Register of Landmarks and Heritage
- Part of: Old Town Historic District
- NRHP reference No.: 78000499 (original); 15000069 (increase)

Significant dates
- Boundary increase: March 17, 2015
- Designated CP: July 18, 1978
- Designated ARLH: July 29, 1977

Temple B'nai Sholom (translated from Hebrew as "Children of Peace") is an historic Reform Jewish congregation and synagogue, located at 103 Lincoln Street SE, in Huntsville, Alabama, in the United States. Founded as a congregation on July 30, 1876, the current synagogue building was dedicated on November 26, 1899. It is the oldest synagogue building in continuous use in the state.

== History ==
In its early years, the congregation struggled to furnish their rented room at the Masonic Lodge in time for the High Holidays in 1876. Members who fell behind on their dues were suspended and their names published in the nationally circulated American Israelite. Of the congregation's 32 founding members in 1876, only 15 were still contributing members by 1878; 11 had been suspended for failure to pay dues.

The congregation employed full-time rabbis from the 1890s until 1913, but was without a resident rabbi for 50 years until 1963. It has maintained full-time rabbinic leadership ever since.

Beginning in the 1950s, the arrival of new residents associated with NASA and the space program and the many Army commands headquartered in Huntsville led to a growth in membership at Temple B'nai Sholom, and a revitalization of the congregation.

The brick building was designed by R.H. Hunt in the Romanesque Revival style and built between in 1898–1899. The building was listed on the Alabama Register of Landmarks and Heritage on July 29, 1977; and is a contributing property located within the Hunstville Old Town Historic District, listed on the National Register of Historic Places on July 18, 1978. The building was extensively renovated in 1994.

In 2017, Temple B'nai Sholom opened the Jewish Heritage Center, a permanent exhibit that shares the Jewish community's history and many contributions to Huntsville's cultural and civic life. Museum tours are available to the public.

== See also ==
- List of the oldest synagogues in the United States
