= B'nai Sholom Temple =

Former Reform synagogue in Quincy, Illinois, United States

- Location of the former synagogue in Illinois

Religion
- Affiliation: Reform Judaism (former)
- Ecclesiastical or organizational status: Synagogue (1869–2019)
- Year consecrated: 1869
- Status: Closed and abandoned

Location
- Location: 427 North 9th Street, Quincy, Illinois
- Country: United States
- Interactive map of B'nai Sholom Temple
- Coordinates: 39°56′12″N 91°24′07″W

Architecture
- Type: Synagogue architecture
- Style: Moorish Revival
- Established: 1852 (as a congregation)
- Groundbreaking: 1869
- Completed: 1870
- Construction cost: $15,500

Specifications
- Minaret: 2 (destroyed in storm)
- Minaret height: 80 feet (24 m) (destroyed)

Website
- bnaisholomquincy.com

B’nai Sholom Temple is a former Reform Jewish congregation and synagogue, located in Quincy, Illinois, United States.

Founded as a congregation in 1852, the synagogue building was built in 1870 in the Moorish Revival style. The original 80-foot (24 m) high, twin minaret-style towers were damaged by a tornado in 1947 and not replaced.

The temple closed in 2019.

== See also ==
- Oldest synagogues in the United States
