= Congregation Beth Israel (Charlottesville, Virginia) =

Synagogue in Virginia, US

Beth Israel
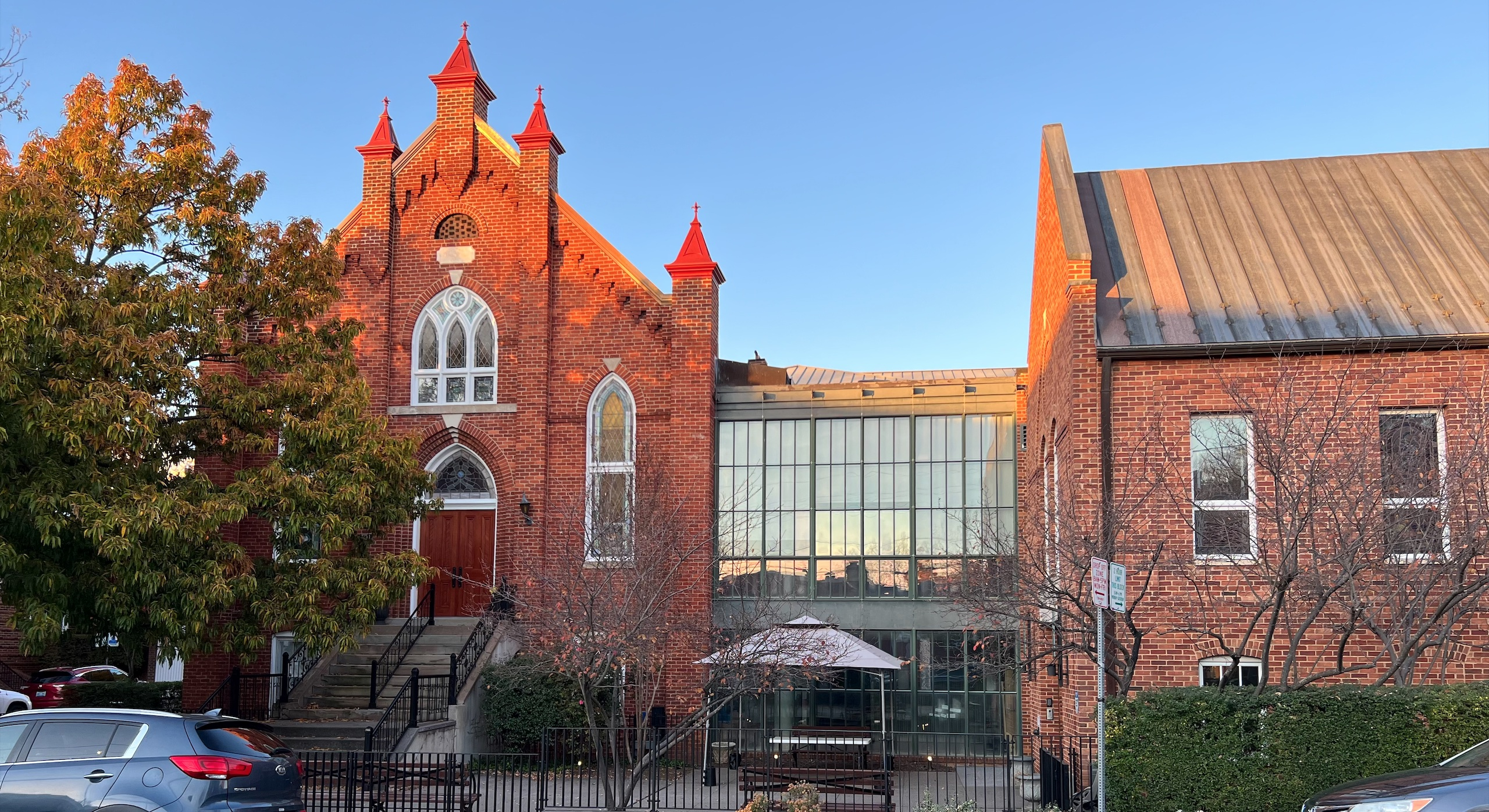
- Beth Israel synagogue

- Location in Virginia

Religion
- Affiliation: Reform Judaism
- Ecclesiastical or organizational status: Synagogue
- Leadership: Rabbi Tom Gutherz
- Status: Active

Location
- Location: 301 East Jefferson Street, Charlottesville, Virginia
- Country: United States
- Interactive map of Beth Israel
- Coordinates: 38°01′55″N 78°28′44″W

Architecture
- Established: 1882 (as a congregation)
- Completed: 1882

Website
- cbicville.org

Congregation Beth Israel is a Reform Jewish synagogue located at 301 East Jefferson Street in Charlottesville, Virginia, in the United States. Founded in 1882, it grew out of Charlottesville's Hebrew Benevolent Society, which was created in 1870.

== Overview ==
The congregation's 1882 building is the oldest synagogue building in Virginia. It joined the Union of American Hebrew Congregations in 1927 and is now a member of the Union for Reform Judaism. The synagogue has an active youth group called Beth Israel Temple Youth (BITY), participating in events with the synagogue throughout the year. It also has a preschool, and religious/Hebrew school.

Congregation Beth Israel offers adult education in the form of lectures, films, and Beit Midrash text study. Worship services include Traditional Egalitarian Shabbat Morning Service, Kabbalat Shabbat Service, and Mishkan T'filah (Reform) Services. These services are intended to be appropriate across ages and household composition. CBI is also involved in mitzvot and acts of tikkun olam through association with and grant funding for local Charlottesville non-profits.

As of 2024, the Senior Rabbi is Tom Gutherz, and the Assistant Rabbi is Ezra Leventhal. Daniel Alexander, Rabbi Emeritus, served as rabbi from 1988 to 2016, and his retirement led the Virginia House of Delegates and Virginia Senate to issue Joint Resolution No. 381, commending Alexander's service to the Congregation Beth Israel and the Charlottesville community for 37 years.
