= Old Town Historic District (Huntsville, Alabama) =

- U.S. National Register of Historic Places
- U.S. Historic district
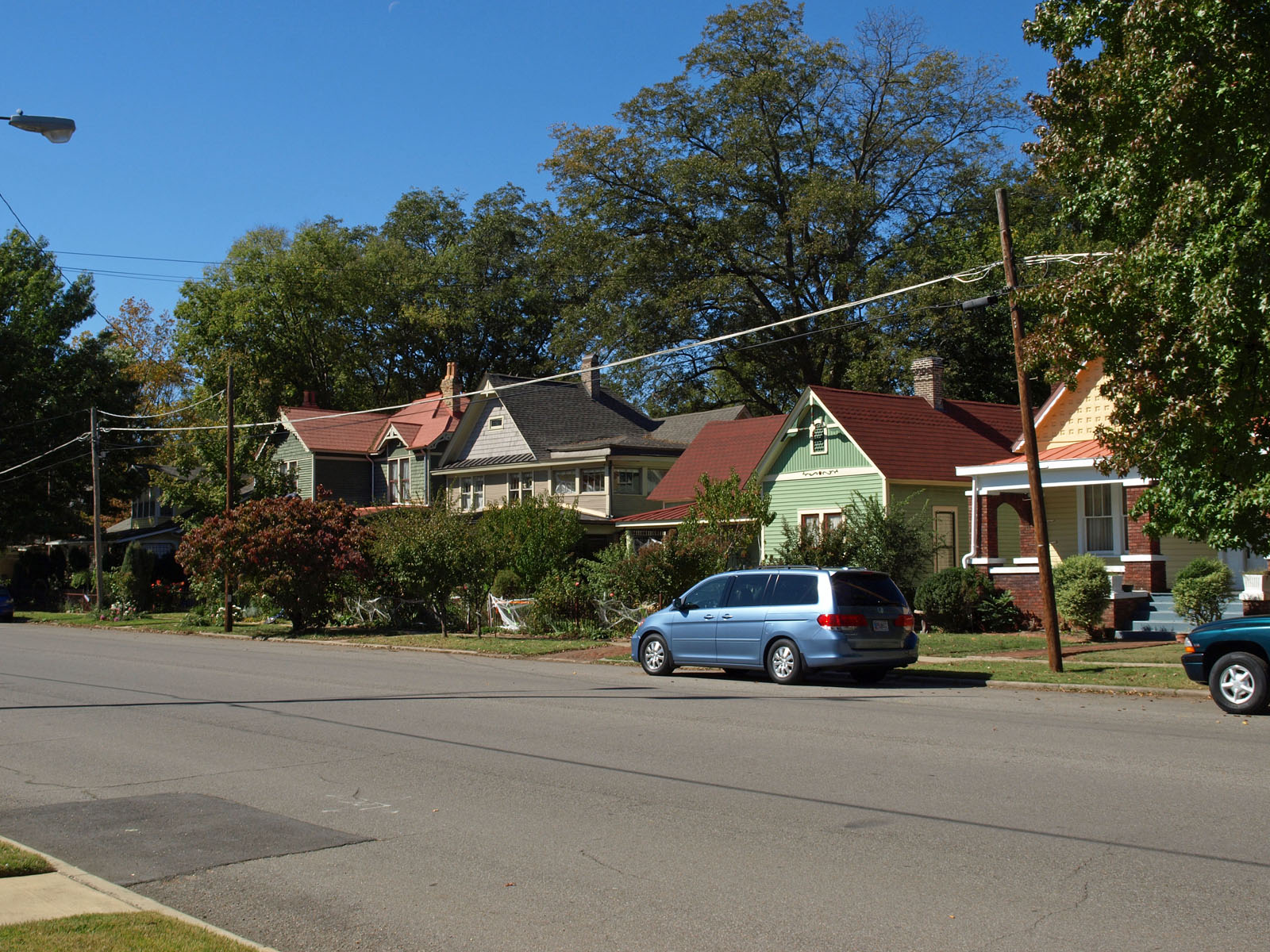
- 700 block of Holmes Avenue

- Location within Huntsville, Alabama Location within Alabama Location within the United States
- Location: Huntsville, Alabama
- Coordinates: 34°44′7″N 86°34′50″W
- Area: 94 acres (38 ha)
- Architect: Multiple
- Architectural style: Victorian, Colonial/Greek Revival, Arts and Crafts, Federal, Art Deco
- NRHP reference No.: 78000499 (original); 15000069 (increase)

Significant dates
- Added to NRHP: July 18, 1978
- Boundary increase: March 17, 2015

The Old Town Historic District was the second historic district in Huntsville, Alabama. It was added to the National Register of Historic Places on July 18, 1978. Roughly bounded by Dement and Lincoln Sts., and Randolph and Walker Avenues, it features homes in a variety of styles including Victorian, Federal, Greek Revival, Queen Anne, American Craftsman, and even Prairie School with homes dating from the late 1820s through the early 20th century.

The Old Town Historic District had its beginnings in 1973, when local architect Harvie Jones suggested to home owners Charles E. and Frances J. Rice that they create another district to include the 19th century homes that remained outside of the Twickenham Historic District. The Rices accordingly began obtaining the necessary petitions and documents to gain first local, then state and finally national recognition for the Old Town Historic District. They were supported in their efforts by then Huntsville mayor Joe W. Davis, Madison County Commissioner Tilman Hill, and Alabama U. S. Senator John Sparkman. The Rices were later honored by the Alabama Historical Commission for their contributions to historic preservation, and in 2009 a small park in Old Town was named after them.

== Notable contributing properties ==
- Temple B'nai Sholom (Huntsville, Alabama)

== See also ==
- National Register of Historic Places listings in Madison County, Alabama
