= Ahavath Beth Israel (Boise, Idaho) =

Reform Jewish synagogue in Idaho, US

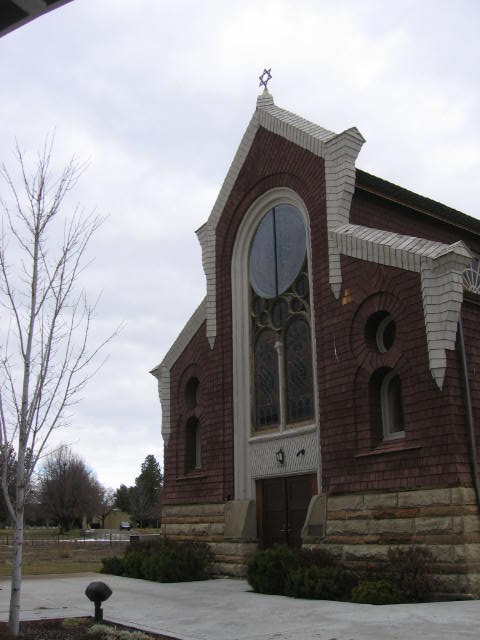
- Ahavath Beth Israel synagogue, in 2010

- Location in Idaho

Religion
- Affiliation: Reform Judaism
- Rite: Nusach Ashkenaz
- Ecclesiastical or organizational status: Synagogue
- Leadership: Rabbi Johanna Hershenson; Board President Betsy Russell
- Status: Active

Location
- Location: 11 North Latah Street, Boise, Idaho 83706
- Country: United States
- Interactive map of Ahavath Beth Israel
- Coordinates: 43°36′19″N 116°13′48″W

Architecture
- Architects: Chestney & Schroeder
- Type: Synagogue architecture
- Style: Rundbogenstil; Moorish Revival
- General contractor: Judkins & Co.
- Established: 1986 (merged congregation): 1895 (as Beth Israel); 1912 (as Ahavath Israel)
- Groundbreaking: 1895
- Completed: 1896 (State Street); 2003 (Relocated)
- Construction cost: $3,159
- Materials: Wood, shingles

Website
- cabi-boise.org
- Ahavath Beth Israel
- U.S. National Register of Historic Places
- NRHP reference No.: 72000432
- Added to NRHP: November 3, 1972

Ahavath Beth Israel, officially Congregation Ahavath Beth Israel (transliterated from Hebrew as "Love of the House of Israel"), is a Reform Jewish congregation and synagogue, located at 11 North Latah Street, in Boise, Idaho, in the United States. Its 1896 building is amongst the oldest synagogues in continuous use west of the Mississippi River. The congregation is affiliated with the Union for Reform Judaism.

== History ==
Boise's first Jews were present in the mining camps in the 1860s, but it was not until 1895 that Congregation Beth Israel (Hebrew for "House of Israel") was formed. Most of the congregants were from Germany and Central Europe and the synagogue followed the Reform tradition. Moses Alexander, mayor of Boise and governor of Idaho, was an early leader of the congregation.

The building was erected in 1896, and given a careful restoration in 1982.

Congregation Ahavath Israel (Hebrew for "Love of Israel") was founded in 1912 by Orthodox immigrants from Eastern Europe. The congregation erected a building at the corner of 27th and Bannock Streets in 1947. The two congregations merged in 1986 to become Ahavath Beth Israel.

A personal memoir/history of Congregation Ahavath Israel was written by one of its member leaders, the late Mr. Joel Stone; a copy of this book is obtainable through the congregation's lending library. A more comprehensive history of Ahavath Beth Israel (which focuses more on Beth Israel's history) was also privately published for limited release by a former member, and is likewise available through the congregation.

== Building ==
The synagogue's wood-shingled 1896 building blends two architecture styles popular with turn-of-the-century Jewish congregations. The exterior is mainly the popular Rundbogenstil style, though the tall windows flanking the large, rose window are in the form of Horseshoe arches. This Moorish Revival detail continues on the inside, where the barrel-vaulted ceiling is supported by horseshoe arches. The architect described the building as designed in a modern Moorish style.

In 1972 the synagogue was added to the National Register of Historic Places. In 2003 the building was moved from its original location on State Street to its current location on Latah Street. During the move documentation was discovered showing the original construction was partially financed by Marshall Field and Levi Strauss & Co.
