= Congregation Ahavath Chesed =

Reform Jewish synagogue in Florida, US

- Location in Florida

Religion
- Affiliation: Reform Judaism
- Ecclesiastical or organizational status: Synagogue
- Leadership: Rabbi Maya Glasser; Rabbi Ashley Englander
- Status: Active

Location
- Location: 8727 San Jose Boulevard, Jacksonville, Florida 32217
- Country: United States
- Interactive map of Congregation Ahavath Chesed
- Coordinates: 30°13′17″N 81°36′57″W

Architecture
- Type: Synagogue
- Established: 1880 (as a congregation)
- Completed: 1882 (Laura and Union Sts.); 1910 (Laura and Ashley Sts.); c. 1927 (in Riverside); 1979 (San Jose Boulevard)
- Destroyed: The Great Fire of 1901 (Laura and Union); 1940 fire (in Riverside)

Website
- thetemplejacksonville.org

Congregation Ahavath Chesed, also called The Temple Jacksonville, or simply, The Temple, is a Reform Jewish congregation and synagogue located at 8727 San Jose Boulevard, in Jacksonville, Florida, in the United States. It is one of the oldest Jewish congregation in Florida and one of the first formally incorporated.

== History ==
Although Jews were already living in Florida in the late 18th century, the Jacksonville Hebrew Cemetery was established in 1857, one year after Temple Beth-El in Pensacola, that is the oldest Jewish communal institution in Florida.

In 1867 the “Israelites of Jacksonville” formed a congregation. The congregation was primarily composed of Jews from Prussia and Germany. For a number of years an organization called the Hebrew Benevolent Society also existed. Congregation Ahavath Chesed was organized in 1880. This congregation, led by Jacksonville's Jewish Mayor, Morris A. Dzialynski, received a legal charter in 1882.

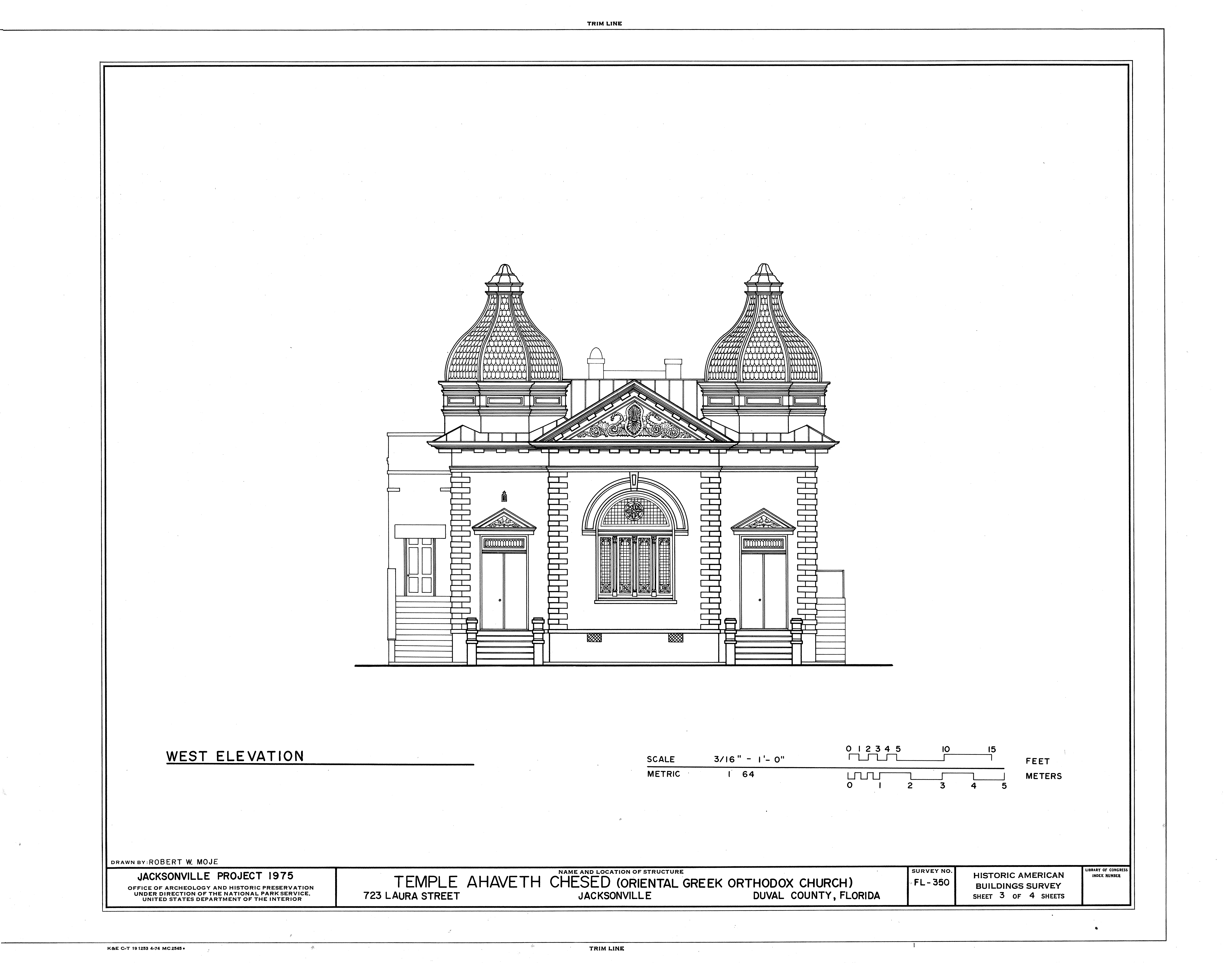
1975 reproduced sketch of the 1910 synagogue at 723 Laura Street.

The congregation hired Rabbi Marx Moses, and dedicated its first synagogue on September 8, 1882. This building was destroyed by the Great Fire of 1901 and replaced by a Neoclassical building, completed in 1910. This building has subsequently been demolished and the site is occupied as part of the First Baptist Church of Jacksonville and associated school, the First Baptist Academy.

In 1927, the congregation purchased a residential building designed by Henry Klutho in Riverside, at the corner of St. Johns Avenue and Mallory Street. After remodelling as a synagogue, that building was destroyed by a fire in 1940, with the subsequent loss of all of the congregation's records. The congregation rebuilt and eventually moved to its current location on San Jose Boulevard.

== See also ==
- History of the Jews in South Florida
- List of the oldest synagogues in the United States
