= Congregation of B'nai Israel Synagogue =

Reform synagogue in Georgia, United States

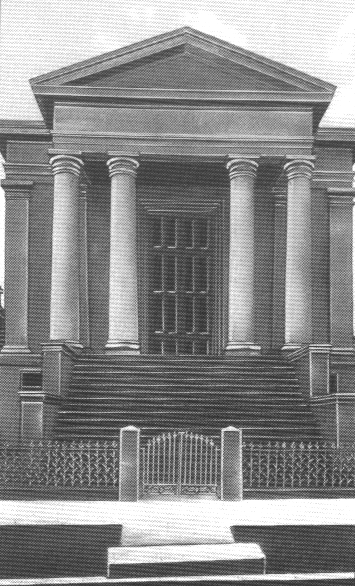
- The synagogue building in c. 1915

- Location in Georgia

Religion
- Affiliation: Reform Judaism
- Ecclesiastical or organizational status: Synagogue
- Status: Active

Location
- Location: 525 Telfair Street, Augusta, Georgia
- Country: United States
- Interactive map of Congregation of B'nai Israel Synagogue
- Coordinates: 33°28′14″N 81°57′41″W

Architecture
- Type: Synagogue
- Style: Greek Revival
- Established: (as a congregation)
- Completed: 1869

Website
- augustajewishmuseum.org
- Congregation of B'nai Israel Synagogue
- U.S. Historic district – Contributing property
- Part of: Augusta Downtown Historic District (ID04000515)
- Designated CP: June 11, 2004

Congregation of B'nai Israel Synagogue is a Reform Jewish congregation and synagogue, located at 525 Telfair Street, in Augusta, Georgia, in the United States. The synagogue building is the oldest synagogue in Georgia. Dedicated in 1869 in the Greek Revival-style, the synagogue is a contributing property of the Augusta Downtown Historic District, that is listed on the National Register of Historic Places.

== Restoration efforts ==
In 2015, the City of Augusta had proposed demolishing the synagogue and the neighboring former Court of Ordinary building with plans to develop more parking for the Municipal Building located next door to the Synagogue.

Soon after the proposal went public, the local Jewish community in Augusta, led by local historian Jack Steinberg, as well as many other citizens concerned about the proposed demolition worked to form a coalition working towards the goal of saving the structures as well as restoring them to become the home of a new Augusta Jewish Museum.

The efforts convinced local leaders to ditch the plans for demolition and after that announcement, a new partnership between Historic Augusta and the local Jewish community was formed with plans for the restoration of the building.

In July 2021, the construction was completed on the Court of the Ordinary building. A dedication ceremony was held for the building commemorating the official opening of Phase One of the project which included attendees from local government leaders to representatives from the Jewish community and Historic Augusta as well.

The Augusta Jewish Museum now reflects on the history of the Jewish community in the Augusta area and includes exhibits on the Holocaust and Israel.

== See also ==
- Jewish history in Colonial America
