= Katz Underwear Company =

American underwear company from 1898 to 1993

- Industry: Underwear
- Founded: September 1898; Honesdale, Pennsylvania, U.S.
- Defunct: 1993

The Katz Underwear Company was an American underwear manufacturing company from 1898 to 1993. It was founded in Honesdale, Pennsylvania.

== Founding and early years (1898 – 1933) ==
The Katz Underwear Company was founded in September 1898 by three Katz Brothers: Jacob F., W. Jonas and Samuel, and began as a small shop with 11 employees on the third floor of the Dodge Building at the corner of Main and Seventh Streets in Honesdale, Pennsylvania. The first product manufactured was muslin underwear under contract to the three largest underwear manufacturers in the United States.

By 1902, the business had outgrown its quarters, and a new factory was built on Sixth Street in Honesdale, Pennsylvania. The Katz brothers decided to discontinue their contract work and began production of their own line. As the company continued to grow, it became necessary to expand facilities, and over the years four additions were made to the original factory.

== Opening in the Empire State Building (1933 – 1948) ==
On October 27, 1933, the company opened its national sales office in New York City on the 39th Floor of the Empire State Building, which remained in the company until the late 1980s until it was moved to Madison Avenue; Katz was one of the oldest tenants in the history of the Empire State Building (1933 - 1988). The Katz Underwear Company's time in the Empire State Building saw an annual visitation of over 1,500 customers and was receiving over 15,000 calls a year. The office handled both large and small accounts, working with buyers from all fifty states and internationally, with Saudi Arabia, China, South Africa, France, UK, Switzerland, South America and the Caribbean.

== Further expansion (1948 – 1986) ==
In 1948, it was announced that a modern, new facility would be constructed on Sunrise Avenue in Honesdale. First occupied in August 1949, the factory underwent four expansions due to the increased volume of the business.

In 1954, it became apparent that the 102,000 sq. ft. Sunrise Avenue Complex would not be capable of filling all the orders the company was receiving, so it sought contractor plants. The first was Solomon & Co. Manufacturing in Lowell, Massachusetts, which was owned by Joseph P. Solomon. It was followed by Rohr Lingerie in Old Forge, Pennsylvania, in 1963, and Coatesville Lingerie, Coatesville, Pennsylvania, in 1968. These firms were later joined by Blough-Wagner Manufacturing, Middleburg, Pennsylvania, in 1969 and by Varsity Manufacturing, Susquehanna, Pennsylvania, in 1972. By the mid-1970s through the mid-1980s, these plants employed over 550 people who were exclusively involved with the Katz label. In addition, to the over 500 employees at the Honesdale locations, the total workforce numbered over 1,000.

By 1985 the Katz Facilities included the main complex on Sunrise Avenue, the original Sixth Street site which was utilized for business offices, warehousing and shipping, and three additional warehouses located on Church, Thirteenth and Chapel Street(s), the latter was developed for shipping and receiving by rail. Through the end of the 1980s, the company was cutting and sewing over seven million yards of fabric a year. The sales force of over forty people nationwide at that time was active in Boston, Atlanta, Dallas, Chicago, Minneapolis and Los Angeles.

By 1985, the company was greatly diversified in its manufacturing. The simple sleepwear gowns remained important, but the rise of loungewear and specialty items became a vital addition to the growth of the business, necessitating the services of a full-time New York designer.

In 1986, with over 7,000 accounts nationwide and internationally, the third generation was transitioning management to the fourth generation as the retirement of Edward L. Freeman, grandson of Jacob F. was ending his tenure as president after nearly forty-five years.

== Sale, closing, and aftermath (1986 – 1993) ==
In 1986, the family of Robert F. Katz, Sr., the grandson of Jacob F. Katz purchased the outstanding family shares of the company for $10.3M. The stockholders were David Katz, William Roos and Edna Roos Lewis the grandchildren of Jonas Katz and from the family of Jacob F. Katz; Kathryn D. Perkins, Marjorie K. Yannis, Edward L. Freeman and Martha F. Sader both principal and trustee for Edward E. Sader, his great great grandson.

The company continued under the new management until 1993, when the children of Robert W. Katz; Robert, Mariann and James decided to close the company.
