= Walter Barylli =

Austrian violinist (1921–2022)

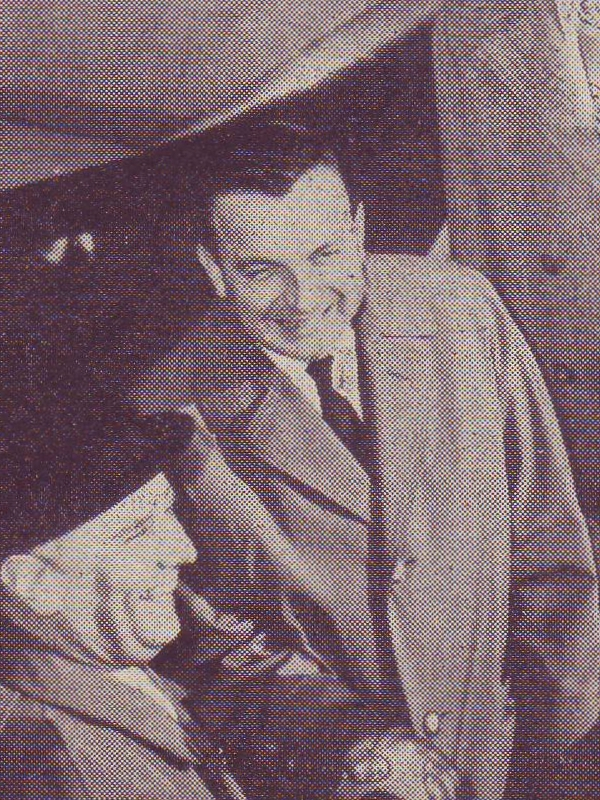
- Barylli in 1957

Background information
- Born: 16 June 1921; Vienna, Austria
- Died: 1 February 2022 (aged 100)
- Genres: Classical
- Occupations: Concertmaster, professor
- Instrument: Violin
- Formerly of: Vienna Philharmonic; Barylli Quartet

Walter Barylli (16 June 1921 – 1 February 2022) was an Austrian violinist who had a distinguished career based in his native Vienna, as Konzertmeister of the Vienna Philharmonic, founder and leader of the Barylli string quartet, and professor of violin at the Vienna City Academy.

== Training ==
Barylli was born in Vienna on 16 June 1921. He studied at the Vienna Music Academy with the Philharmonic Konzertmeister Franz Mairecker, and in Munich with Florizel von Reuter, a violinist who had achieved outstanding success early in life. Von Reuter took the fifteen-year-old boy into his own home at Munich so that he could continue his studies without excessive expense to his parents.

== Career ==
In 1936 Barylli gave his first public performance as a soloist in Munich, and made his first gramophone recordings in Berlin. Over the next two years he made an international career as a soloist. F. Mairecker advised him that in autumn 1938 a first violin desk would become available with the Vienna Philharmonic. Travelling to the audition at Vienna by train from Stuttgart on 12 March 1938 he became aware of the preparations for the invasion of Austria and realised he must make his career with an orchestra rather than as a travelling soloist: he won the place and became a member of the VPO.

During the War he first brought the Barylli Quartet together. He re-founded it in 1945, but its life in public performance lay mainly between 1951 and 1960. The group became the 'home' quartet of the Vienna Musikverein. They performed in Europe and overseas, and made several appearances at the Salzburg Festivals. The group concentrated on classic repertoire, especially Beethoven, Mozart, Schumann, Schubert and Brahms. They collaborated with Antoine de Bavier, Jörg Demus, Paul Badura-Skoda, Edith Farnadi and Wilhelm Huebner.

Barylli won the Kreisler Prize of the City of Vienna twice. He retired in 1973 and taught at the City of Vienna Conservatory from 1969 until 1986.

== Personal life and death ==
Barylli was the father of actor and playwright Gabriel Barylli (born 1957).

He turned 100 on 16 June 2021, and died on 1 February 2022.

== Students ==
Robert W. Eshbach, professor of violin, University of New Hampshire.

== Literature ==
- Walter Barylli: Ein Philharmoniker einmal anders (Memoir), Verlag für photographische Literatur, ISBN 978-3-901239-18-2
