= Adolf Guttmacher =

German-American rabbi

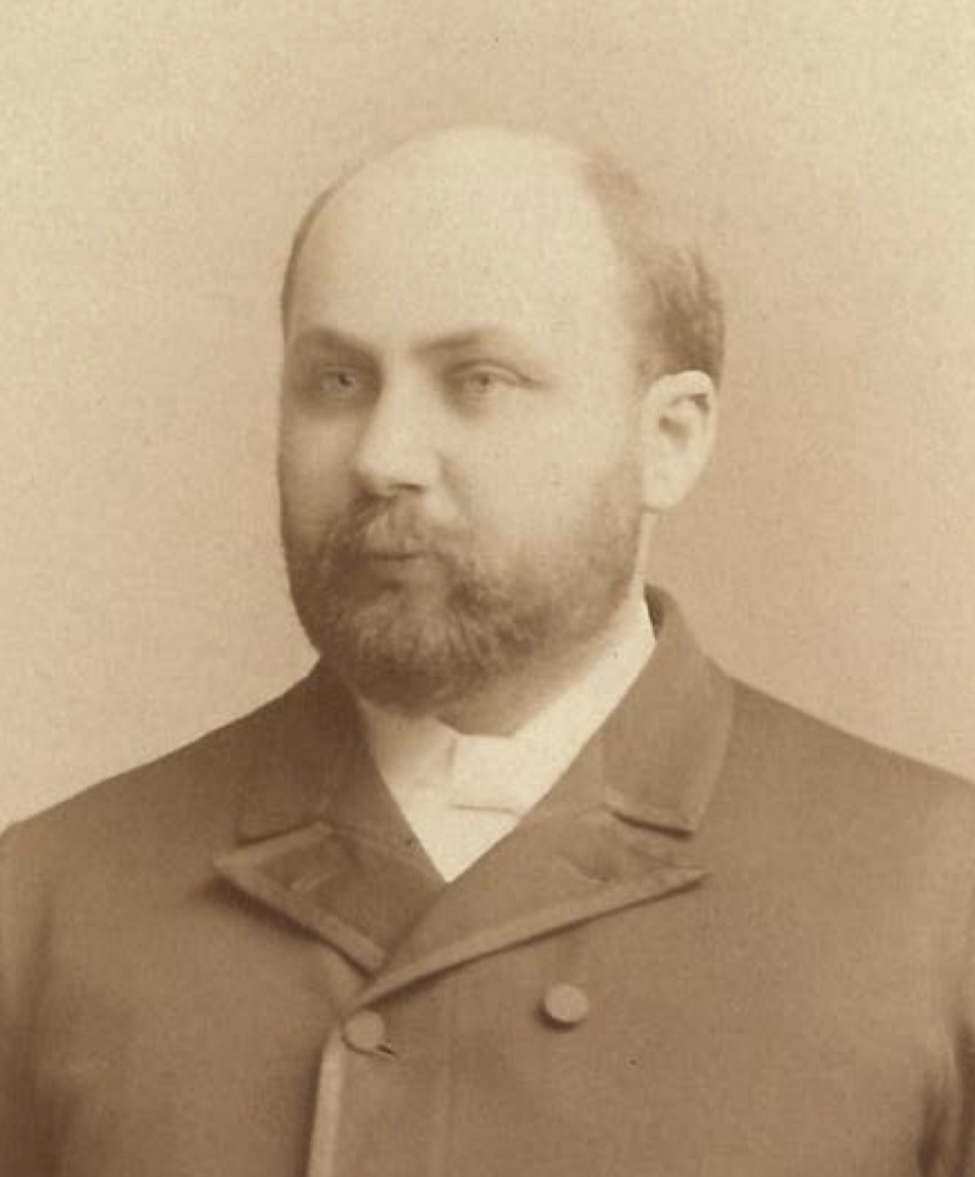

Adolf Guttmacher (January 7, 1861 – January 17, 1915) was a German-American rabbi who mainly ministered in Baltimore, Maryland.

== Life ==
Guttmacher was born on January 7, 1861, in Jaraczewo, Prussia, the son of Manheim and Dorothea Guttmacher. His father was a merchant.

Guttmacher attended the Judisches Lehrer Seminar in Berlin. He immigrated to America in 1882, and at one point he taught German and French at the Ohio University in Athens, Ohio. He then began studying at the University of Cincinnati and Hebrew Union College, graduating from both in 1889. In that year, he became rabbi of Congregation Achduth Vesholom in Fort Wayne, Indiana. While in Fort Wayne, he taught German, French, and Hebrew at Taylor University.

In 1891, Guttmacher was named rabbi of the Baltimore Hebrew Congregation in Baltimore, Maryland. He served as rabbi there until his death. Shortly after arriving in Baltimore, he also began studying Hebrew, Arabic, and the history of philosophy at the Semitic Department of Johns Hopkins University. He received a Ph.D. from there in 1900, and his thesis "Optimism and Pessimism in the Old and New Testaments" was later published into a book. A regular contributor to the American Jewish press and the local secular press, he was the religious editorial writer of The Baltimore Sunday Sun for a number of years.

Guttmacher wrote "A History of the Baltimore Hebrew Congregation" in 1905, "A Sabbath School Companion for Jewish Children" in 1907, and "The Perpetual Light–Prayers and Meditations on Death for Home and Burial Ground" in 1913. He contributed several articles to The Jewish Encyclopedia, and a number of his sermons were published in the Jewish press. He was an editor of the Jewish Comment in its early years. He was also vice-president of the Hebrew Education Society, an advisory of the Daughters of Israel, president of the Jewish Home for Consumptives, an executive of the Federated Jewish Charities, secretary of the Eudowood Sanitarium, a director of the Maryland Prisoners' Aid Association, a board member of the Maryland Society for the Protection of Children from Cruelty and Immorality, president of the Alumni Association of the Hebrew Union College, recording secretary and publication committee chairman of the Central Conference of American Rabbis, and a member of the Gesellschaft zur Foerderung der Wissenschaft des Judentums, the Alliance Israélite Universelle, and the American Oriental Society. In 1892, he married Laura Oppenheimer of Fort Wayne. They had a daughter and two sons.

Guttmacher died on a train near Huntingdon, Pennsylvania while on his way to Chicago, Illinois for the Union of American Hebrew Congregations and the National Federation of Temple Sisterhood conventions on January 17, 1915. His funeral at the Baltimore Hebrew Congregation was so crowded that a large throng waiting outside required a detachment of Boy Scouts and police officers to direct movements to and from the building. Cantor George Castelle of the Baltimore Hebrew Congregation, Rabbi William Rosenau of the Oheb Shalom Congregation, Rabbi Tobias Schanfarber of Kehilath Anshe Ma'arav in Chicago, and Rabbi Charles A. Rubenstein of the Har Sinai Congregation all delivered eulogies. The honorary pallbearers were close personal friends and the congregation's trustees, and directors of the United Hebrew Charities and the Eudowood Auxiliary attended the funeral. He was buried in the Hebrew Cemetery.
