= Barylli Quartet =

Austrian String Quartet

The Barylli Quartet was a celebrated Austrian string quartet classical musical ensemble. It was first brought together in Vienna during the War by Walter Barylli, Konzertmeister of the Vienna Philharmonic Orchestra from 1939, but was re-founded in 1945. The reformed quartet actually appeared in public performance only from 1951 to 1960. In that period it was the 'home' quartet of the Vienna Musikverein.

== Personnel ==
- 1st violin - Walter Barylli
- 2nd violin - Otto Strasser
- Viola - Rudolf Streng
- Cello - Richard Krotschak, Emanuel Brabec

Many of the famous HI—FI Westminster Records recordings are with Emanuel Brabec.

== Origins ==
Walter Barylli (born in Vienna in 1921–2022) studied at the Vienna Music Academy with the Philharmonic Konzertmeister Franz Mairecker, and in Munich with Florizel von Reuter. In 1936 Barylli gave his first public performance as a soloist in Munich, and made his first gramophone recordings in Berlin. Over the next two years he made an international career as a soloist: but realizing the difficulty of a career as a travelling soloist in the turmoil of the late 1930s he instead won a place at the Vienna Philharmonic Orchestra, of which he became Konzertmeister in 1939. The quartet was first formed from leading members of the Vienna Philharmonic, during the war. It was then reformed in 1945, but its work in public performance was mainly confined to the period 1951–1960.

Closely associated with the Vienna Musikverein, their work was principally with classic repertoire such as Beethoven, Mozart, Schubert, Schumann and Brahms. They gave many concerts in Europe and overseas. Among their various recordings are a complete Beethoven cycle for Westminster Records and a near-complete Mozart cycle. They performed at the Salzburg Festival, from which at least two live concerts (from 1956, Mozart Quintet with Antoine de Bavier, and 1958, of Beethoven, Schubert and Hindemith), have also survived as recordings. Their principal collaborations in chamber music were with Antoine de Bavier, Edith Farnadi, Jörg Demus, Paul Badura-Skoda and the violist Wilhelm Hübner.

Emanuel Brabec, the group's cellist in 1958, taught at the Vienna Academy and was teacher of Nikolaus Harnoncourt.
