= UJA-Federation of New York =

Philanthropic organization

- Nickname: UJA
- Formation: 1917
- Type: 501(c)(3) Nonprofit
- Tax ID no.: 51-0172429
- Headquarters: New York City
- Locations: Westchester, New York; Long Island, New York; Jerusalem
- Chief Executive Officer: Dr. Michael A. Kay
- President: Suzanne F. Peck
- Chair of the Board: David H. Wasserman
- Budget: $249.7 million USD (2021)
- Endowment: $1.2 billion USD (2021)
- Website: www.ujafedny.org

UJA-Federation of New York (United Jewish Appeal⁣ – ⁣Federation of Jewish Philanthropies of New York, commonly known as UJA) is a major Jewish community and philanthropic organization predominantly serving the New York metro area.

Headquartered in New York City, UJA raises and allocates funds to "care for Jews everywhere and New Yorkers of all backgrounds, respond to crises close to home and far away, and shape our Jewish future." distributing support to social service, healthcare, NGOs, and community agencies in New York, Israel, and over 70 other countries.

== History ==
UJA-Federation, as it is known today, was created from the 1986 merger of the United Jewish Appeal, established in 1939, and the Federation of Jewish Philanthropies of New York, a predecessor organization established in 1917.

During the late 1980s, UJA-Federation participated in the Soviet Jewry Movement with its Passage to Freedom campaign to help Jewish Émigrés from the Soviet Union.

== Finances ==
The organization's fundraising capacity has grown significantly over decades. In 2016, the annual campaign raised $153.4 million, bringing total funds raised to $207.6 million. By 2021, the annual campaign raised $63.2 million, while total funds raised reached $249.6 million alongside an endowment valued at $1.2 billion.

== Leadership ==
Dr. Michael A. Kay, former head of the The Leffell School, assumed the position of Chief Executive Officer on October 5, 2026, replacing Eric S. Goldstein, CEO Emeritus, who served from 2014-2026. Past leadership includes John S. Ruskay, Executive Vice President Emeritus.

Suzanne Peck was appointed president of UJA on July 1, 2026, and David Wasserman was appointed chair of the board. Other notable organizational appointments include Rabbi Menachem Creditor as the Pearl and Ira Meyer Scholar-in-Residence starting in July 2018, former Israeli Minister Itzik Shmuli as Director-General of the Jerusalem office in 2021, and former New York State Assembly member Daniel Rosenthal as vice president of Government Relations in 2023.

=== As Federation of Jewish Philanthropies of New York (1917–1986) ===
- Felix M. Warburg (President, 1917–1921)
- I. Edwin Goldwasser (Executive Director, 1917–1920)
- Solomon Lowenstein (Executive Director, 1920–1935)
- Joseph L. Buttenwieser (President, 1924–1926)
- Sol M. Stroock (President, 1926–1929)
- Joseph M. Proskauer (President, 1931–1935)
- Samuel D. Leidesdorf (President, 1935–1937)
- Benjamin Buttenwieser (President, 1939–1941)
- George Z. Medalie (President, 1941–1945)
- Salim L. Lewis (President, 1954–1957)
- Gus Levy (President, 1957–1960)
- Lawrence Wien (President, 1960–1963)
- Irving Mitchell Felt (President, 1963–1966)
- Frederick P. Rose (President, 1974–1977)
- Wilma Tisch (President, 1980–1983)

=== As United Jewish Appeal of Greater New York (1942–1986) ===
- Sylvan Gotshal (President, 1942–1947)
- Edward Warburg (President, 1967)
- Herbert Tenzer (President, 1972)
- Laurence Tisch (President, 1973–1974)

=== As UJA-Federation of New York (1986–Present) ===
- Joseph Gurwin (Chair of the Board, 1988–1991)
- Larry Silverstein (Chair of the Board, 1994–1997)
- James S. Tisch (President, 1998–2001)
- John S. Ruskay (Chief Executive Officer, 1999–2014)
- Larry Zicklin (Chair of the Board, 2000–2001; President, 2001–2004)
- Morris W. Offit (Chair of the Board, 2001–2004; President, 2004–2007)
- Susan Stern (Chair of the Board, 2004–2007)
- Jerry W. Levin (Chair of the Board, 2007–2010; President, 2010–2013)
- Robert S. Kapito (Chair of the Board, 2016–2019)
- Marc Rowan (Chair of the Board, 2023-2026)

== Emergency response and relief ==
UJA frequently mobilizes emergency relief campaigns for local and international crises. During the COVID-19 pandemic, the organization allocated nearly $70 million in emergency grants, and conducted an impact study surveying 4,400 New York-area Jews to assess financial and mental health strains.

Following the 2022 Russian invasion of Ukraine, UJA-Federation rapidly mobilized relief efforts, leveraging its established network supporting post-Soviet Jewish communities to distribute more than $25 million across dozens of organizations.

UJA engages in rapid crisis mobilization in Israel, including establishing in 2001 the Israel Trauma Coalition, which coordinates trauma and emergency preparedness. Following the October 7 attacks, UJA created an "Israel Emergency Fund", which raised over $150 million in two months.

== Archives and legacy ==
Both the Center for Jewish History and the American Jewish Historical Society, an affiliate of the Smithsonian, houses UJA-Federation's archives. Beginning in 1981, the Federation of Jewish Philanthropies of New York conducted an oral history project. It continued through the merger between Federation and the United Jewish Appeal of Greater New York until 2004. A collection of oral histories was published in 1995.

To honor its centennial in 2017, the American Jewish Historical Society produced an exhibition exploring a timeline of UJA-Federation from 1917 to 2017, PBS produced a documentary for its Treasures of New York series, and a book, UJA-Federation of New York: The First Century, was published.

== See also ==
- American Jewish Historical Society
- Center for Jewish History
- Hebrew Free Loan Society of New York
- Jewish Federations of North America
- Jews in New York City
