= William Kolodney =

Russian-born American cultural educator

Dr. William Kolodney

William Kolodney (1899 – January 18, 1976) was a Russian-born American cultural educator and program director for two major New York City institutions, the 92nd Street Y and the Metropolitan Museum of Art.

== Early life and education ==
Kolodney was born in Minsk, and his family moved to America when he was 4 years old. He attended New York University as an undergraduate and earned a master's degree and a Doctorate from Columbia University. His dissertation was based on his work at the 92nd Street Y, describing its transformation during his tenure into "a major arts institution".

== 92nd Street Y ==
Kolodney created the educational program for the YMHA in Pittsburgh in 1926. In 1935, he joined the 92nd street Y in New York as Educational Director, instituting a wide-ranging educational program. He made the "Y" a center for chamber music, poetry readings, and dance performances. He was guided by idealistic principles. He decided "not to popularize or glamorize knowledge through publicity methods designed to attract large numbers." At the same time, he felt that fees for "Y" programs "should be small enough to enable the clerical or the salaried worker with a modest income to enroll in any activity which might meet his needs and interests."

Kolodney felt that music was a way to educate the emotions and that each person "responds differently to every sound, from the wind in the trees to a Shostakovich symphony." He presented great musicians such as Rudolf Serkin, Myra Hess, Gregor Piatigorsky, Erica Morini, and Joseph Hoffman as well as the Budapest String Quartet in annual series. He established the Y School of Music under the direction of Abraham Wolf Binder, who believed that it was more important to teach a child how to listen to music than to play an instrument.

In 1936 Kolodney invited Martha Graham to give a dance recital as part of the new Dance Center at the "Y". During the next ten years she performed there as a solo recitalist or with her group. Other dancers or faculty at the "Y" have included Doris Humphrey, Charles Weidman, Hanya Holm, Anna Sokolow, Agnes de Mille, Paul Taylor, José Limón and Alvin Ailey among others. When Ailey received New York's Handel Medallion, he said he could not have formed his company without the support of Kolodney. In 1974, Agnes de Mille said "No other institution in the United States has done more for American dance. Without William Kolodney, there simply was no place to go. He gave us a stage and an intelligent audience. He taught us to hope."

Kolodney created The Poetry Center at the "Y" in 1939 "to meet the needs of the very few persons in New York to whom poetry offers the theological, ethical and esthetic equivalents of traditional religion". Poetry was Kolodney's greatest love: "At the center we had the greatest poets, Eliot, Cummings, Stevens. Eliot turned down other institutions to read at the 'Y'". His favorite poet was Edward Arlington Robinson. In 1953 Kolodney arranged for the Poetry Center to present the first NY performance of Dylan Thomas's Under Milk Wood. Kolodney attempted to compile a volume of "Y" Poetry Center poets' responses, including a letter from T.S. Eliot, to the anti-Semitic 1952 Slánský trial in Soviet Czechoslovakia, but the volume was never released.

When he retired from the 92nd Street Y after 35 years in 1969, a New York Times editorial noted that he had made the "Y" "the source of some of the most varied and stimulating artistic fare in the nation. His view was ecumenical; the person was always submerged in the artist. He made the "Y" a stay against confusion, a place where for a moment all that is harmonious, stable, beautiful comes to rest."

== The Metropolitan Museum of Art ==
In 1954, while still Education Director at the 'Y', Kolodney created a music program at the Metropolitan Museum of Art. The Met had recently renovated the Grace Rainey Rogers Auditorium to feature arts programs. The first season of concerts presented pianist Arthur Rubinstein, violinist Isaac Stern, folk singer Burl Ives, and contralto Marian Anderson. Three years later, Kolodney initiated a subscription series of lectures on art for the museum. Art historian Leo Steinberg launched the program with 10 lectures on "Change and Permanence in Western Art". Kolodney continued to head the Concerts & Lectures series at the Met until 1968.

== Personal life ==
Kolodney died in Mamaroneck, New York. His children were Nathan, David and Rima.
