= John S. Ruskay =

American businessperson

John S. Ruskay (born August 3, 1946), is executive vice president emeritus of UJA-Federation of New York and a senior partner of JRB Consulting Services. He served as a commissioner of the United States Commission on International Religious Freedom from May 2016 to May 2018. Ruskay is an author and lecturer on issues affecting the Jewish people.

== Biography ==
Ruskay was a senior professional at UJA-Federation for 22 years beginning in 1993, the last 15 (1999–2014) as executive vice president and CEO. He called for the federation to become a creative resource for the creation of "inspired and caring communities" which can engage Jews on the basis of providing meaning, purpose and community, and forged bold initiatives to realize that vision.

Prior to UJA-Federation, Ruskay held senior leadership positions including vice chancellor, The Jewish Theological Seminary of America (1985–1993); and education director, the 92nd Street YM-YWHA (1980–1985). He also chaired the publication committee of the Journal of Jewish Communal Service and the professional advisory committee of the Brandeis University Hornstein Jewish Professional Leadership Program (2001–2007). Ruskay was a founding member of the controversial organization Breira (1972–1977), which took a left-wing position on Israeli-Palestinian political issues.

On December 8, 2009, John Ruskay's tenth anniversary as executive vice president and CEO of UJA-Federation was commemorated with a panel discussion about the organization's work of the last decade. Updating his 1999 inaugural address, Ruskay delivered a speech titled "Living Lives of Sacred Responsibility" in which he articulated four issues that require UJA-Federation's attention moving forward: 1) the affordability of Jewish life; 2) connecting the work of human service agencies to Jewish day schools, Hillels, and community centers; 3) reviewing the organization's future role in Israel; and 4) differentiating Israel advocacy and Israel education.

== Articles and speeches ==
Ruskay has written and speaks on how the American Jewish community can most effectively respond to the challenges and opportunities of living in an open society, the role of Jewish philanthropy, and the central role of community.

- Beyond naming and shaming: New strategies needed to combat antisemitism], ejewishphilanthropy.com (2021)
- Pew's Limited View], ejewishphilanthropy.com (2021)
- Antisemitism and its Impact on Jewish Identity], JPPI (2021)
- Israel Advocacy and Israel Education--Leadership Must Decide], JPPI (2021)
- Healing Our Country Begins with the Right to Vote], Jewish Week (2020)
- What Will Be Required], HUC-JIR (2013)
- Funder Roundtable: A Conversation with Jenn Hoos Rothberg, Rafi Rone, Jennie Rosenn, John Ruskay, and Jon Rosenberg], Journal of Jewish Communal Service (2012)
- Combating Delegitimization Requires a Big Tent], Jewish Week (2011)
- Federations and Foundations Take On Innovating and Sustaining: A Dialogue with John Ruskay and Jeffrey Solomon], Journal of Jewish Communal Service (2011)
- Talking With John Ruskay: Looking Forward (2010)
- F·E·G·S and UJA-Federation: Working Together to Strengthen the Community, Journal of Jewish Communal Service (2010)
- Living Lives of Sacred Responsibility], UJA Federation NY (2009)
- Innovation: One Size Does Not Fit All], eJewish Philanthropy (2009)
- Organized Philanthropy's Relationship to Independent Jewish Philanthropy: A Dialogue between John Ruskay and Jeffrey Solomon], Journal of Jewish Communal Service (2009)
- Sustaining Versus Innovative: Debunking a False Dichotomy], Contact (Winter 2006)
- UJA-Federation of New York: Strengthening a Global Jewish Identity (An Interview with John Ruskay)], Jerusalem Center for Public Affairs
- Strengthening Community Post September 11] (2002)
- Looking Forward: Our Three-Pronged Challenge and Opportunity], Journal of Jewish Communal Service (2000)
- Response "A Statement on the Jewish Future," American Jewish Committee] (1998)
- American Jewry's Focus on Continuity – At Ten Years] (1999)
- From Challenge to Opportunity: To Build Inspired Communities], Journal of Jewish Communal Service (1995)
- "From Challenge to : To Build Inspired Communities," Journal of Jewish Communal Service, Fall/Winter, 1995/6, pp. 22–33.
- "Historic Change and Communal Responsibility: The Jewish Communal Agenda and the Challenge of Emerging Philanthropic Trends," The 1996 Solender Lecture, UJA-Federation of New York, 1996.
- Zionism and the Conservative/Masorti Movement, co-editor with David Szonyi, Jewish Theological Seminary, 1990.
- "Diaspora-Israel Relations: The Potential Role of the Arts," Textures, Volume VII, Number 3 (June/July 1989).
- "Introduction," The Seminary at 100, edited by Nina Beth Cardin and David Wolfe Silverman, JTS/RA.
- "Adult Jewish Education: Continuing the Learning Experience," Jewish Education at the CJF General Assembly 1987, Council of Jewish Federation/Jewish Education Service of North American, 1988, New York.
- "Challenges for Moriah VI – and for the Future," Moriah Journal published by North American Jewish Forum, 1988.
- "The Challenge of Outreach: Examining a Living Model," The Melton Journal, Summer 1984.
