= Gioconda de Vito =

Italian violist (1907–1994)

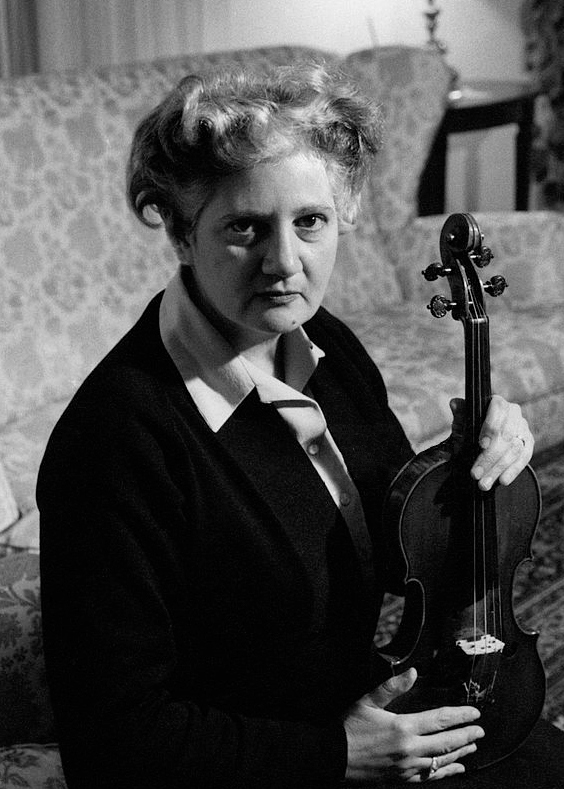
Gioconda de Vito in 1961

Gioconda de Vito (26 July 1907 – 14 October 1994) was an Italian-British classical violinist. (The dates 22 June 1907 and 24 October 1994 also appear in some sources.)

== Life ==
De Vito was born, one of five children, in the town of Martina Franca in southern Italy, to a wine-making family. Initially she played the violin untaught, having received only music theory lessons from the local bandmaster. Her uncle, a professional violinist based in Germany, heard her attempting a concerto by Charles Auguste de Bériot when she was aged only eight, and decided to teach her himself. At age 11, she entered the Rossini Conservatory in Pesaro to study with Remy Prìncipe. She graduated at age 13, commenced a career as a soloist, and at age 17 became Professor of Violin at the newly founded conservatory in Bari. In 1932, aged 25, she won the first International Violin Competition in Vienna. After she played the Bach Chaconne in D minor, Jan Kubelík came up to the stage and kissed her hand (she later appeared under the baton of Kubelik’s son Rafael Kubelík).

She then taught at Palermo and Rome, at the Accademia di Santa Cecilia. She had earlier been presented to Benito Mussolini, who greatly admired her playing, and he used his influence to get her the Rome post. World War II interrupted what would otherwise have been the most productive period of her burgeoning career. In 1944, she was given the unique honour of a lifetime professorship at the Academy.

In 1944, de Vito premiered the Violin Concerto of Ildebrando Pizzetti. She made the first of her relatively few recordings for His Master's Voice after the war. She made her London debut in 1948 under Victor de Sabata, playing the Brahms concerto. This was very successful, and led to performances at the Edinburgh Festival and with fellow artists such as Yehudi Menuhin, Isaac Stern and Arturo Benedetti Michelangeli. By 1953, she was considered Europe's No. 1 female violinist, while remaining virtually unknown in the United States.

De Vito played under Wilhelm Furtwängler a number of times, and had a great affinity for his approach. In 1953 they also played a Brahms sonata at Castel Gandolfo for Pope Pius XII, the choice of Brahms being the Pope's own request. In 1957 de Vito played the Mendelssohn concerto for the Pope. A member of the audience later sent her a letter saying that he was no longer an atheist, because her playing of the slow movement had made him realise there must be a God.

During that concert, de Vito realised she had reached the pinnacle of her career, and decided to retire in another three years. After informing the pope of her decision, Pius XII tried for an hour to dissuade her, saying she was far too young to retire so early, but to no avail. During the final years of her career, de Vito collaborated with Edwin Fischer, who was also nearing the end of his career. At their recording sessions for the Brahms sonatas Nos.1 and 3, he had required medical attention. The recording of Sonata No. 2 was assumed by Tito Aprea in 1956, after they successfully recorded Beethoven's Kreutzer and Frank's A major sonatas. Edwin Fischer died in 1960.

In 1961, at the age of 54, De Vito retired from concert appearances and from any violin playing at all. She also decided not to teach. Once while on holiday in Greece, she encountered Yehudi Menuhin on a beach and she agreed to play some duets with him at his villa. Unfortunately, when they arrived at the villa, Menuhin realised he did not have a spare violin with him, so the opportunity to resume playing did not materialize. However, she had recorded Viotti's Duo in G with Menuhin in 1955 and they recorded Handel's Trio Sonata in G minor with John Shinebourne, cello and Raymond Leppard, harpsichord. Both recordings are included Disc 41 of Menuhin – the Great EMI Recordings. Two years earlier Menuhin, de Vito and Shinebourne along with harpsichordist George Malcolm, recorded Handel's Op.5/2 "Sonata for 2 Violins and Continuo in D" (Complete EMI Recordings, Korean issue from 2013). All of these works were recorded in EMI's Abbey Road Studio No.3.

De Vito never played in the United States, although Arturo Toscanini and Charles Munch repeatedly invited her to do so. (She had played Bach for Toscanini in Paris in the 1930s, and he commented: "That's the way Bach should be played".) However, she did appear in Australia (1957 & 1960), Argentina, India, Israel and Europe; and in the Soviet Union, where she was juror for the first Tchaikovsky Violin Competition, at the invitation of David Oistrakh.

De Vito's repertoire was small; it excluded most of the popular violin concertos written after the 19th century (for example, those by Elgar, Sibelius, Bartók, Berg, Bloch and Walton) – the sole exception being the Pizzetti concerto. Her particular favourites were "the three Bs" – Bach, Beethoven and Brahms. Her major recordings were issued in 1990 as The Art of Gioconda de Vito. They include the Bach Double Violin Concerto with Yehudi Menuhin, conducted by Anthony Bernard.

== Private life ==
In 1949, de Vito married David Bicknell, an executive with EMI Records, and although she lived in Britain from 1951, her English was always rudimentary and she often required a translator. Bicknell died in 1988, and Gioconda de Vito died in 1994, aged 87.

== Sources and notable links ==
- In Vito Veritas
- Jessica Duchen’s classical music blog
- Eric Blom, Grove's Dictionary of Music and Musicians, 5th ed, 1954
- Discography at Youngrok Lee's music page
