= Makom Solel Lakeside =

Reform synagogue in Illinois, United States

- Location in Chicago, Illinois

Religion
- Affiliation: Reform Judaism
- Ecclesiastical or organisational status: Synagogue
- Leadership: Rabbi Evan Moffic; Rabbi Ike Serotta; Rabbi Dov Taylor (Emeritus)
- Status: Active

Location
- Location: 1301 Clavey Road, Highland Park, North Shore, Chicago, Illinois 60035
- Country: United States
- Coordinates: 42°09′38″N 87°48′03″W

Architecture
- Established: 2019 (merged congregation): 1955 (Lakeside Congregation); 1957 (Congregation Solel)

Website
- mymakom.org

Makom Solel Lakeside is a Reform Jewish congregation and synagogue, located at 1301 Clavey Road, in Highland Park, Illinois, in the United States. The congregation's origins date back to the founding of the Lakeside Congregation for Reform Judaism in 1955 and Congregation Solel in 1957. The two congregations merged in 2019. Makom Solel Lakeside has approximately 550 member families.

== Founding ==
Congregation Solel originated as a branch of Illinois' oldest synagogue, Congregation Kehilat Anshe Maavriv (now part of KAM Isaiah Israel), located in Kenwood, Chicago since 1924. After a group of KAM members relocated from the South Side of Chicago to the North Shore suburbs of Highland Park, Glencoe, and Winnetka, they sought to establish a similar congregation in their new community, forming KAM-North Shore. Rabbi Jacob Weinstein of KAM initially planned to move to the North Shore to lead the new congregation. However, after a year of traveling between the two synagogues, he decided to remain in Chicago. KAM-North Shore then appointed its first full-time rabbi, Arnold Jacob Wolf.

Lakeside Congregation for Reform Judaism also traced its origins to the exodus of Jewish families from Chicago's South Side to the North Shore. Many of its founders were former members of the Chicago Sinai Congregation, then located in East Hyde Park. With support from the American Council for Judaism, they established a Hebrew school in Highland Park, which became the oldest institution of Reform Judaism in the city. In 1955, the school’s families incorporated as Lakeside Congregation and hired their first rabbi, Dr. Richard Singer, husband of June Singer. Dr. Singer left the congregation in 1960 to become a Jungian analyst.

== History ==
=== Early years ===
Rabbi Arnold Jacob Wolf began his career at Congregation Solel. He is credited with suggesting the synagogue's name, "Solel," which means "pathfinder" or "trailblazer" in Hebrew. Under his leadership, the congregation experienced significant growth and introduced programs including free trips to Israel for students completing four years of Hebrew education. Congregation Solel was one of the first synagogues to hold annual Holocaust remembrance weekends. In the late 1960s, Congregation Solel was among the first American synagogues to embrace the chavurah model. Rabbi Lawrence Kushner served as a Rabbinic Fellow.

Martin Luther King Jr. spoke at Congregation Solel on June 30, 1966 as part of an event organized by the North Shore Fellowship of Rabbis. Rabbi Wolf invited the Chicago Seven to speak at the synagogue in 1968.

During this period, Rabbi Joseph Ginsberg led Lakeside Congregation until his retirement in 1972. Rabbi Ginsberg had previously led Congregation Anshai Emeth in Peoria, Illinois. He helped establish a day camp in collaboration with the North Shore Unitarian Church to foster dialogue between children from North Shore congregations and Black children from Chicago. Rabbi Wolf, dissatisfied with the synagogue world, left Solel in 1972 to become the Jewish chaplain at Yale University.

=== Rabbis Marx, Freyer, Jaye, and Levi ===
Rabbi Robert Marx, founder of the Jewish Council on Urban Affairs, left his position as the regional director of the Union of American Hebrew Congregations to become the rabbi of Solel after Wolf's departure. During his tenure at Solel, the congregation expanded its social justice programs. Rabbi Marx left Solel in 1983.

During the 1970s and 1980s, Lakeside Congregation was led by Rabbi Bruce Freyer, a Vietnam veteran who openly opposed the war. He was succeeded by Rabbi Harold Jaye, an academic who left the congregation to become a full-time university professor in Florida. Rabbi Charles Levi assumed leadership of the congregation into the 1990s.

=== Rabbi Dov Taylor ===
Rabbi Dov Taylor, previously the senior rabbi of Temple Ohabei Shalom in Brookline, Massachusetts, became rabbi of Congregation Solel in 1984. During Rabbi Taylor's tenure, Congregation Solel became involved in the Soviet Jewry movement. Many congregants actively participated by traveling to the Soviet Union and working to support the refuseniks. Solel, which had maintained a capped membership since its early years, experienced steady growth, which prompted the congregation to repeatedly raise its membership cap. Rabbi Taylor left Congregation Solel in 2009 to become the rabbi of the Woodstock Jewish Congregation in Woodstock, Vermont.

=== Rabbis Serotta and Moffic ===
Rabbi Evan Moffic began his tenure at Congregation Solel in July 2009. During his time there, he placed a strong emphasis on welcoming interfaith families and revitalizing the synagogue’s religious school alongside educator Ashley Plotnick. Rabbi Moffic also prioritized strengthening the synagogue’s connection to the State of Israel. In response to the congregation’s growth, Solel expanded its staff and completed a new building addition, which opened in March 2010.

Isaac Serotta began serving as rabbi of Lakeside Congregation in 1998. Under his leadership, in partnership with long-time educator Vanessa Ehrlich, the size of the congregation and its religious school more than doubled. Rabbi Serotta fostered a strong emphasis on both education and initiated community trips to the State of Israel.

Collaboration between the two congregations grew under the leadership of Rabbis Serotta and Moffic, who worked together on religious services and social justice initiatives. Over time, their efforts laid the groundwork for uniting the two congregations, which were less than half a mile apart. By 2019, the congregations formally merged to create Makom Solel Lakeside after both communities voted overwhelmingly in favor of the union. The name “Makom,” means “holy place” in Hebrew.

== Programming ==
Makom Solel Lakeside has a volunteer choir and is led by Cantor Jay O’Brien. The congregation has a long musical tradition, with past contributions from choir directors including Dr. Warren Fremling and Dr. Richard Boldrey, who now holds the title of Choir Director Emeritus. A former student of Dr. Boldrey at Northwestern University currently serves as the choir director. Previous cantors include Michael Davis and Vicky Glikin.

The congregation remains committed to social action. It is a member of Lake County United and actively collaborates with the Religious Action Center of Reform Judaism and its Illinois affiliate, RAC-IL. Rabbi Isaac Serotta serves on RAC-IL’s core committee, alongside other members of the congregation, some of whom also participate in the Reform Movement's Commission on Social Action. Members are involved with the Union for Reform Judaism’s national board and partner with organizations such as the Jewish Council on Urban Affairs and the Association of Reform Zionists of America.

Makom Solel Lakeside welcomes interfaith couples and families, providing full participation in lifecycle events.

== See also ==
- History of the Jews in Chicago
- KAM Isaiah Israel
