= Jakob Grün =

Austrian violinist (1837–1916)

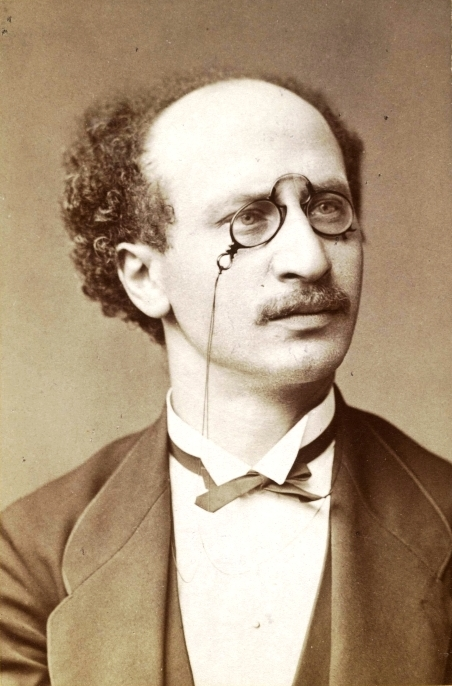
- Jakob Grün, photograph by Josef Székely
- Born: Grün Jakab Moritz; 13 March 1837; Pest, Kingdom of Hungary, Austrian Empire
- Died: 1 October 1916 (aged 79); Baden bei Wien, Austria-Hungary
- Education: Leizipig Conservatory
- Occupations: Classical violinist; Academic teacher
- Organizations: Hofkapelle zu Hannover; Vienna Court Opera Orchestra; Vienna Conservatory
- Awards: Order of Franz Joseph

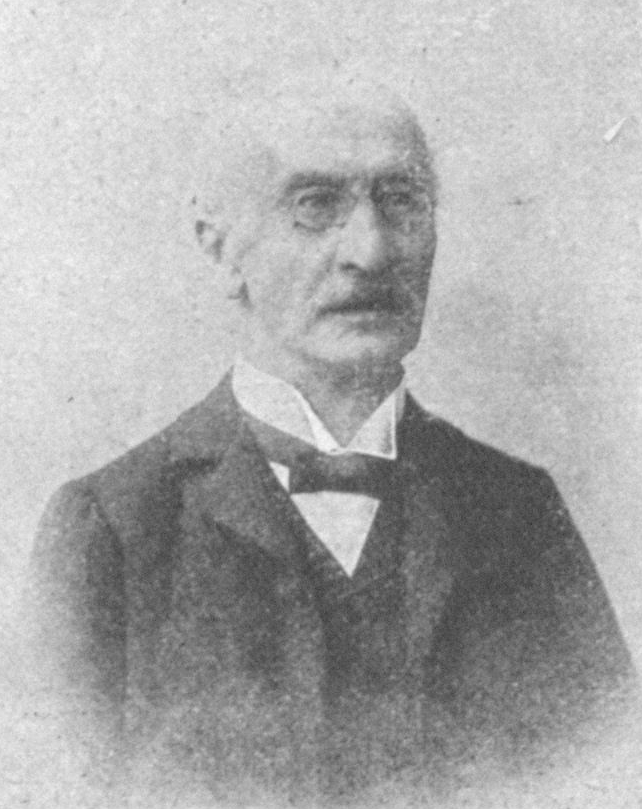
Jakob Grün

Jakob Moritz Grün (Hungarian: Grün Jakab; 13 March 1837 – 1 October 1916) was an Austrian violinist of Hungarian origin. After positions as principal violinist in the court orchestras of Weimar and Hannover, he was, from 1868 to 1897, concertmaster of the Vienna Court Opera Orchestra. He taught notable players at the Vienna Conservatory from 1877 to 1908, including 20 future orchestra members, as well as Carl Flesch and Franz Kneisel.

== Life ==
Born in Pest, Kingdom of Hungary, Austrian Empire, Grün received his first music lessons there and then studied violin privately with Joseph Böhm in Vienna. He studied music with Moritz Hauptmann at the Leipziger Conservatorium der Musik.

From 1858 to 1861, Grün was principal violinist of the Hofkapelle in Weimar. In 1861, Joseph Joachim called him to the Hofkapelle zu Hannover, planning for a permanent engagement. When Grün, in 1864, was not granted a permanent position with a pension because he was Jewish, Joachim quit the orchestra in solidarity. Grün remained until 1865, with a title of Kammervirtuose but without a pension. From 1865, Grün toured as a soloist in Germany, Holland and England for two years.

On 1 October 1868 he became second concertmaster of the Imperial and Royal Vienna Court Opera Orchestra (later: Vienna Philharmonic) and remained a member of the orchestra until 1897, while the first concertmaster was Josef Hellmesberger. Grün liked to play solos standing, a tradition he knew from Hungary, though he suffered from stage-fright when playing solo, which impeded his career as a soloist. From 1877 to 1908, he was also a teacher at the Vienna Conservatory and trained an entire generation in the tradition of the Viennese violin school. Twenty of his students would become members of the Philharmonic, including concertmasters Julius Stwertka and Franz Mairecker, and principal violists Franz Jelinek and Karl Freith. He also taught Carl Flesch, Rosa Hochmann, Franz Kneisel, Hans Wessely and Max Weißgärber.

Grün's flat was located in Heugasse 18 (today Prinz-Eugen-Straße) in Wieden.

Grün died in Baden near Vienna at the age of 79. His grave is in the Vienna Central Cemetery.

== Awards ==
- Knight's Cross of the Order of Franz Joseph
- Cross of Merit (Austria-Hungary)
- Medal bene merenti from Romania
- Honorary member of the Wiener Tonkünstler-Orchester
