= Felix Stransky =

Austrian banker and Holocaust survivor

- Born: May 26, 1871; Brno, Moravia (Brno, Czech Republic)
- Died: October 22, 1950 (aged 79); Vienna, Austria
- Occupation: Banker
- Known for: Holocaust survivor and banker

Felix Stranky (26 May 1871 – 22 October 1950) was an Austrian banker and Holocaust survivor. He was deputy Director of the Nö. Escompte-Ges until his retirement in 1932. As a jew he was persecuted by the Nazis and was sent to the Theresienstadt Ghetto during World War II. He survived and returned to Vienna after the war where he became vice president of the Konzerthaus, Vienna. He owned an extensive art collection.

== Early life ==
Stransky was born in Brno, Moravia (Brno, Czech Republic) on 26 May 1871; he died in Vienna on 22 October 1950.

He was the son of the Brno factory owner Moritz, brother of Siegmund Stransky and Dr. Erwin Stransky (born in Vienna on 3 July 1877; died there on 26 January 1962), who made a name for himself as a psychiatrist from the school of Wagner-Jaureg.

In 1900 Stranskly married the Russian-born violin virtuoso Rosa Hochmann. They separated in 1908. After training as a banker, Stransky worked initially in England, Romania and Germany. In 1898/99 he came to St. Petersburg as an authorized signatory of the Wawelberg banking house and in early 1901 accepted a position as director of the Swiss Bank Corporation in Zurich. Bankver. in Zurich..

1905 Deputy Director of the Nö. Escompte-Ges. in Vienna, he advanced to become one of the three board directors in 1906 and remained in this position until his retirement in 1932. As a result of the close connection between banking and industry, Stransky sat on numerous corporate boards, including as president of the Austrian Josef Inwald AG Vienna, the glass factories and refineries Josef Inwald AG Prague, as vice president of the First Austrian Glanzstoff-Fabriks AG St. Pölten, the Zentral Gas- und Elektrizitäts AG Budapest and the Austrian Brown Boveri-Werke AG. He was active as a supervisory board member in more than 40 other companies. His outstanding position in Austrian banking and economics before 1938 is also reflected in his functions as First Vice President of the Vienna Stock Exchange Chamber, Vice President of the Association of Austrian Banks and Bankers and of the Vienna Trade Fair, and President of the Association of the Vienna Trade Academy.

== Art and culture ==
In addition to his professional activities, Stranksy pursued numerous social and artistic interests. He was vice president of the board of trustees of the General Polyclinic in Vienna. He was active with the Vienna Konzerthausges to whose board of directors he was appointed in 1914, serving as financial advisor from 1915, and as vice-president from 1919. From 1937 he was the first honorary member of the Vienna Konzerthausges. Stransky also owned an extensive art collection, which included almost all Austrian painting of the 19th century.

== Nazi persecution ==
After Austria's incorporation into the Nazi Reich in the Anschluss of 1938, Stransky was persecuted as a Jew. The Nazis seized his property and in May 1943 he was deported to Terezín. There, he was a member of the supervisory board of the "Bank of Jewish Self-Government," one of those institutions with which the Nazis attempted to feign normality to the outside world. He survived the concentration camp and returned to Vienna at the beginning of July 1945, where he served as vice president and financial advisor of the Wr. Konzerthausges.

== Awards ==
He was decorated with the Order of the Iron Crown III. class in 1908 and was an officer of the French Legion of Honor.

== Family ==
His brother Sigmund Stransky (born in Brno on 28 September 1864; died in Vienna on 21 November 1938); was a chemist and a pianist. In 1886 he received his doctorate. He then worked for many years as technical director at Fanto Petroleum AG, and later as general director of AG für Mineralöl-Ind. He was regarded as an outstanding expert in the construction and operation of petroleum refineries, and was also involved in atomic physics and the toxic alkaloid mixture veratrin, which is used as an insecticide. As a member of the Society of Friends of Music and a member of the board of its orchestra association, Sigmund Stransky performed as a pianist at its concerts. His villa in Bad Vöslau, built by Otto Wagner, was a meeting place for numerous artists.

== Restitution claims for Nazi looted property ==
In 2006, the painting "Porträt Stephanie Gräfin Wurmbrand-Stuppach" by Hans Canon, which had been looted by Nazis and recovered by the Monuments Men, was restituted to the Stransky family. The German government had kept it from 1949 to 2006. Other paintings that were looted under the Nazis and restituted in the 21st century include: "Bildnis einer alten Frau in schwarzem Kleid und weißer Rüschenhaube mit roten Bändern" ["Brustbild einer alten Frau mit weißer Haube"] by Ferdinand Georg Waldmüller, and "Rastende Jägergruppe mit Jagdbeute" ("Rastende Jäger mit erlegtem Wild, Hunden und einem Pferd") by Johann Mathias Ranftl.

Stranky's family has listed artworks by Friedrich Gauermann, Josef Danhauser and Anton Einsle on the German Lost Art Foundation.
