= Morris W. Offit =

- Born: Baltimore, MD
- Education: Johns Hopkins University (BA); University of Pennsylvania (MBA)
- Occupations: Businessman; banker

Morris Wolf Offit is an American financier and philanthropist. He founded Offitbank, a private wealth management firm that merged with Wachovia in 1999, and later worked in senior roles at Salomon Brothers, Julius Baer, and AIG. An alumnus of Johns Hopkins University, Offit led the university's successful 1980s capital campaign and chaired the board of trustees from 1990 to 1996. At the conclusion of his tenure as chairman of the board, Johns Hopkins awarded Offit an honorary Doctor of Humane Letters. He is the namesake of Johns Hopkins' Bernstein-Offit Building, as well as the Morris W. Offit Chair in International Finance in the Paul H. Nitze School of Advanced International Studies.

== Early life and education ==
Offit is the son of Michael Offit and Rhea Offit (née Wolf). He received a Bachelor of Arts from Johns Hopkins University in 1957. He subsequently earned a Master of Business Administration from the Wharton School of the University of Pennsylvania. He is also a Chartered Financial Analyst.

== Career ==
=== Early career ===
Offit began his career in 1960 in investment research at Mercantile Safe Deposit and Trust Company in Baltimore. In 1968, he joined Salomon Brothers in New York as a general partner, a position he held for approximately a decade. There he established the firm's Stock Research Department and subsequently took on responsibility for its fixed income and equity sales operations. During the 1970s, he and Michael Bloomberg worked together as partners at the firm. Decades later, Offit would be described by New York Magazine as "one of Bloomberg's closest business friends."

From 1980 to 1982, he was President of Julius Baer Securities Inc.

In 1983, Offit founded Offit Associates Inc., an investment advisory firm in Manhattan, and that same year was an adjunct professor of finance at Columbia Business School, lecturing on the secondary capital markets.

=== OFFITBANK ===
In July 1990, Offit converted Offit Associates into Offitbank, a private bank specializing in wealth management services for high-net-worth clients, with Offit as chief executive officer. In 1999, OFFITBANK was acquired by Wachovia Bank. Following the merger, Offit was on Wachovia's board of directors, but departed in 2002 in opposition to First Union's takeover bid for Wachovia.

=== Offit Hall Capital Management and Offit Capital Advisors ===
In early 2002, Offit collaborated with San Francisco-based wealth management firm Laurel Management to form Offit Hall Capital Management LLC, with Offit as co-chief executive officer. In July 2007, the Offit family parted company with Offit Hall (subsequently renamed Hall Capital Partners) and co-founded Offit Capital Advisors LLC, a New York-based private investment advisory firm. Offit is the firm's chairman and managing member; his son Ned S. Offit is chief executive officer. From May 2005 to May 2013, Offit was a director of American International Group (AIG), and chairman of its Finance and Risk Management Committee.

== Civic roles ==
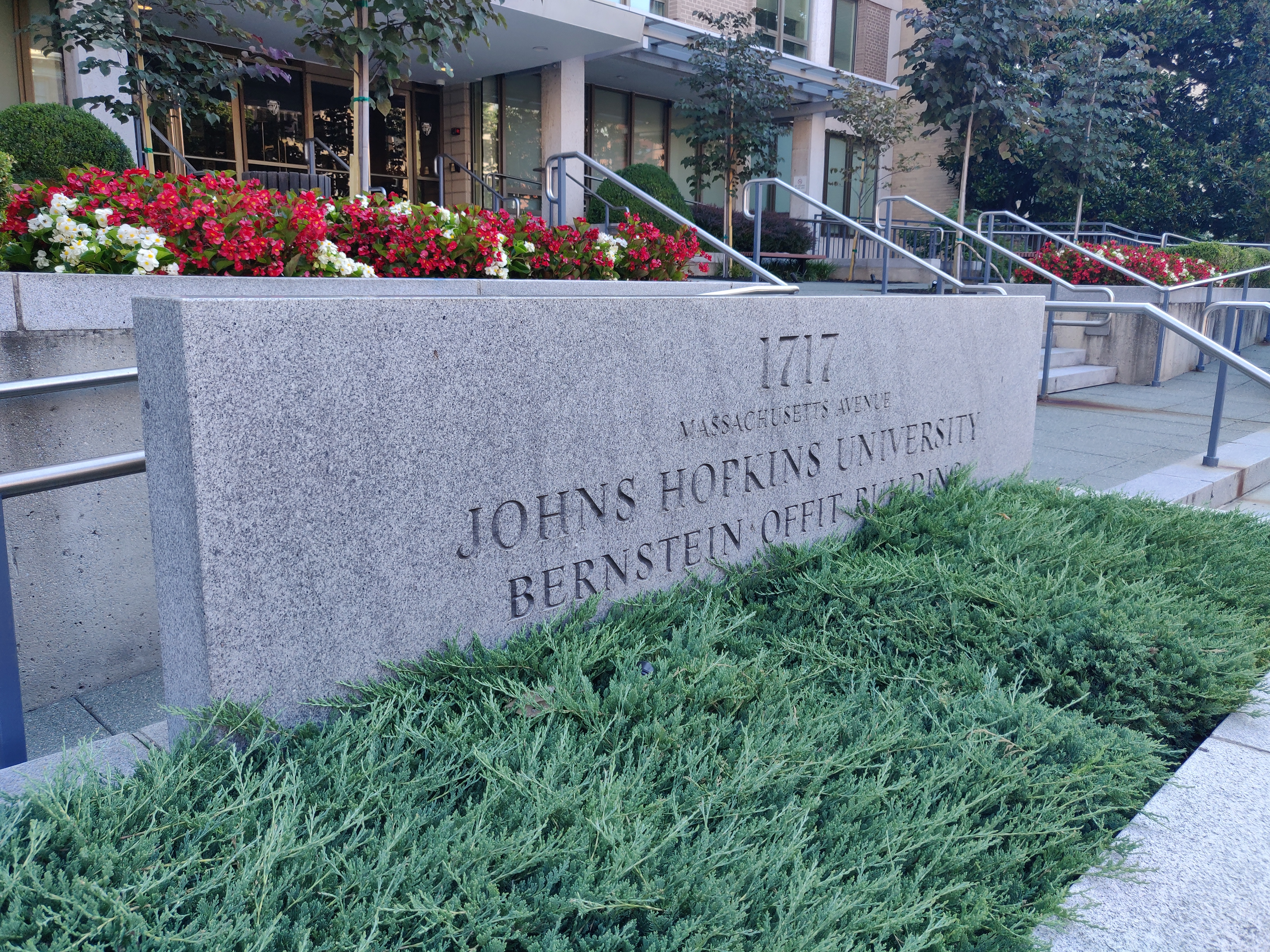
Offit is the namesake of Johns Hopkins' Bernstein Offit Building

Offit has had extensive philanthropic involvement with Johns Hopkins University. During the 1980s he chaired the Campaign for Johns Hopkins. In 1996, upon stepping down as board chairman, he received an honorary doctorate from the university. He also endowed the Morris W. Offit Chair in International Finance at the Johns Hopkins School of Advanced International Studies (SAIS), and his name is attached to the Bernstein-Offit Building in Washington, D.C. Offit is also credited with helping to spur significant donations to Johns Hopkins by fellow alumnus Michael Bloomberg.

Offit, a supporter of the Two state solution in Israel, was president and chairman of UJA-Federation of New York from 2001 to 2007. He chaired the board of the Jewish Museum from 1987 to 1991, and was a trustee of the New-York Historical Society, the Museum of the American Revolution in Philadelphia, WNET (public broadcasting), Columbia University Teachers College, Union Theological Seminary, and the American Jewish Committee.

In 1998, Offit was named Philanthropist of the Year by the Greater New York Chapter of the National Society of Fund Raising Executives. In 2017, he was a gala honoree at the New Jewish Home's Eight over Eighty celebration.
