= Quartetto Italiano =

String quartet (founded 1945)

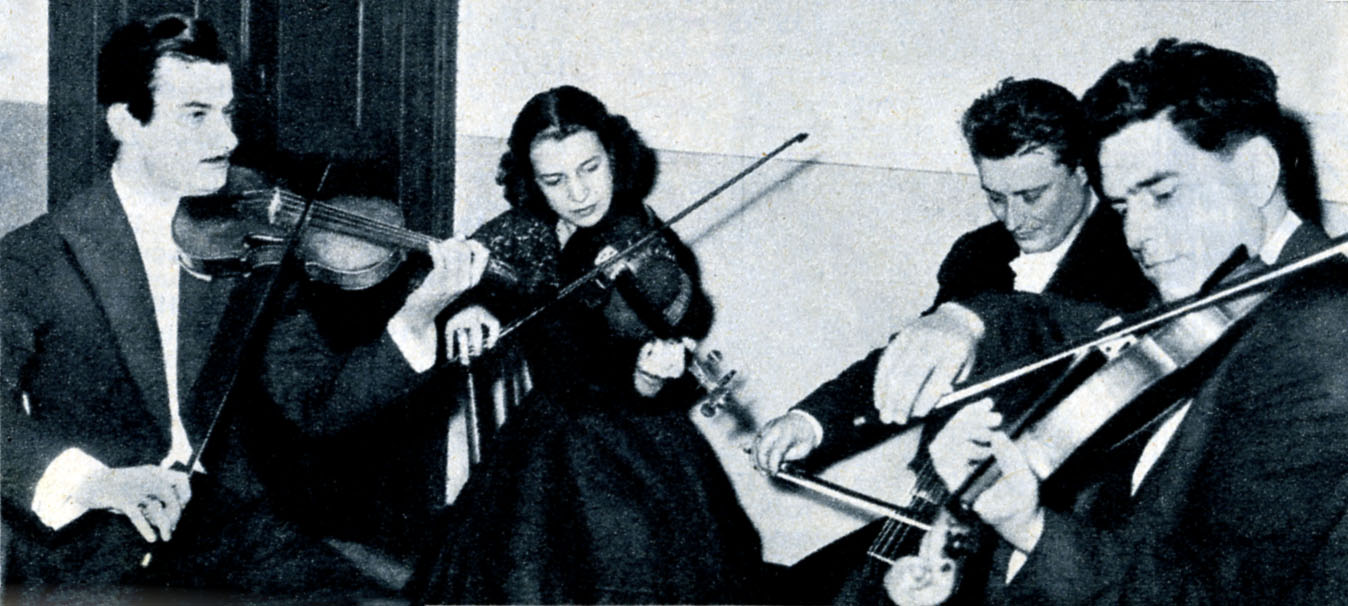
- Quartetto Italiano (1955)

Background information
- Origin: Reggio Emilia, Italy
- Genres: Classical
- Occupation: String Quartet
- Years active: 1945–1980
- Labels: Telefunken Italia, Columbia, Decca, Philips, Deutsche Grammophon, Audite
- Past members: Paolo Borciani, 1st violin (founder & leader); Elisa Pegreffi, 2nd violin; Lionello Forzanti, viola (1945-47); Piero Farulli, viola (1947-77); Dino Asciolla, viola (1977-80); Franco Rossi, cello.

The Quartetto Italiano (English: Italian Quartet) was a string quartet founded in Reggio Emilia in 1945. They made their debut in 1945 in Carpi when all four players were still in their early 20s. They were originally named Nuovo Quartetto Italiano (to distinguish the ensemble from another "Quartetto Italiano", which had been founded at the beginning of the twentieth century by the violinist Remigio (Remy) Prìncipe) before dropping the "Nuovo" tag in 1951. They are particularly noted for their recording of the complete cycle of Beethoven string quartets, made between 1967 and 1975. The quartet disbanded in 1980.

The secretary and historian of the Quartet was Guido Alberto Borciani (Reggio Emilia, 20 October 1920 – 4 April 2008), brother of Paolo Borciani, the quartet's founder and player of the 1st violin part. A mechanical engineer and talented pianist, Guido Alberto founded in 1987 the Premio Paolo Borciani.

== Origins and activities ==
Borciani, Pegreffi and Rossi met in 1940 at the Concorso Nazionale in La Spezia. In summer 1942 they met again at the Accademia Musicale Chigiana in Siena, where the cellist Arturo Bonucci (Sr.) (head of the chamber class, husband of Pina Carmirelli) put them together with the viola player Lionello Forzanti for the study session. They worked together on the Debussy quartet and performed it in September 1942.

In August 1945 the group began to study together again at the Borciani house in Reggio Emilia. Their debut followed on 12 November 1945 at the Sala dei Mori in Carpi, as the Nuovo Quartetto Italiano, in the inaugural concert of the Società degli Amici della Musica. By the end of the year they had also performed in Reggio Emilia and in Milan. In March 1946 they were winners at the Concorso of the Accademia Nazionale di Santa Cecilia, and also in the Concorso of the Accademia Filarmonica Romana. A performance for the Milan Quartet Society followed, and the first foreign engagement was at the Zürich Tonhalle.

In February 1947 Piero Farulli replaced Forzanti at the viola desk, and the first performance in the new (and permanent) company was in Mantua. Debuts followed that year in Austria, England, at the Venice International Festival, and at the Engadin Konzertwochen (where their collaboration with clarinettist Antoine de Bavier in the Mozart Quintet K.581 occurred - recorded also for Decca label). They also gave the world premiere of the Heitor Villa-Lobos work Quartet No.9 at the Accademia Filarmonica Romana.

Appearances in Italy, England, Scotland, Spain and France followed in 1948, totalling 63 concerts, and the group began recording for Decca Records. Concerts rose to over 100 in 1949, with visits to Sweden, Czechoslovakia, Denmark, Norway and the Netherlands. At Stockholm Royal Academy they gave a series of lecture-recitals with Gerda Busoni, widow of Ferruccio Busoni. Another century of concerts was given in 1950.

In 1951 (having dropped the word “Nuovo” (i.e., new) from their name) the Quartet performed at the Edinburgh Festival and at the Salzburg Festival. It was at Salzburg that they had a long and very influential interview with Wilhelm Furtwängler, who urged them to work towards a much greater freedom of expression which would access for them the world of Grand Romanticism. This was much later acknowledged as a critical turning-point for the group.

In November they made their first U.S. tour, which was repeated in approximately alternate years until 1977. Virgil Thomson pronounced them “The finest string quartet, unquestionably, that our century has known.” In 1953, the year in which they transferred their recording programme to Columbia Records, they gave 59 concerts in the U.S. and Canada. In that year also, Elisa Pegreffi married Paolo Borciani.

Recordings which followed included (1954) the Darius Milhaud Quartet No.12, and (1956) the Debussy Quartet, which Robert Kemp described as “miraculous”. The group was then studying the six Mozart Quartets dedicated to Joseph Haydn, and performed them at venues including Milan and Fiesole. Important Festival appearances continued, at Lucerne (1955), the Maggio Musicale Fiorentino (1959), the Prague Spring Festival (1961) and the Berlin Musikwochen. In 1977, NASA launched the two Voyager space probes. Each carried a Golden Record, bearing images and sounds to represent the Earth and mankind. One of the images was a photograph of the Quartetto Italiano.

Through the later 1960s and early 1970s the group toured further afield, to Yugoslavia (1966), to South America (1968), to South Africa and Zambia (1970), and to Poland, the U.S.S.R. and Japan in 1973. Meanwhile, their recording projects for Philips Records, begun in 1965, were coming to fruition, with the Mozart integrale finished in 1972 and the Beethoven in 1973.

In this later period their collaboration with Maurizio Pollini took place. The completion of their recording work in Schubert did not occur until 1977. In their late concerts the group focussed especially upon Beethoven and Schubert, often devoting a recital to two works, a single masterpiece by each composer. In December 1977 Piero Farulli was obliged to retire from the group owing to illness, and was replaced by Dino Asciolla. Dino Asciolla was an eminent viola maestro with many recordings, including 'Le sonate per Pianoforte ed Archi (Doppio CD)' with Corrado Galzio (pianoforte), Dino Asciolla (viola), Salvatore Accardo (violino) and Francesco Maggio Ormezowski (violoncello).

However, following a tour of Israel it was decided to bring the Quartet to an end in 1980.

== Later years ==
Paolo Borciani (Reggio Emilia, 21 December 1922 – Milano, 5 July 1985) devoted his later years to J.S. Bach's The Art of Fugue (his last recording was made in Bergamo at Sala Piatti on 3 May 1985) with his wife, Pegreffi and two pupils of Farulli and Rossi (Tommaso Poggi, viola and Luca Simoncini, cello). Elisa Pegreffi (Genova, 10 June 1922 – Milano, 14 January 2016) devoted herself to teaching; Piero Farulli (Firenze, 13 January 1920 – Fiesole, 2 September 2012) found his place in the school of Fiesole; Franco Rossi (Venezia, 31 March 1921 - Firenze, 28 November 2006) returned to the performance of chamber music. All four were awarded the Gold Medal of the Benemeriti della Scuola, della Cultura e dell'Arte by the Italian President Francesco Cossiga.

== Notes on recordings ==
The Quartetto Italiano have recorded the complete quartets by Beethoven, Mozart, Schumann, Brahms and Webern. They rarely collaborated with external members, but two notable recordings are Mozart's Clarinet Quintet with Antoine-Pierre de Bavier (Decca LXT 2698 - rec: 18-22.II.1952), and Brahms's Piano Quintet Op.34 with Maurizio Pollini (Deutsche Grammophon DG 2531197 - 24-28.I.1979). They also planned to play Schubert's String Quintet with Pierre Fournier, and Mozart's Quintet with two violas (K.516) with Milan Škampa, violist of the Smetana Quartet, but neither project was realized, the first due to the impossibility of finding a concert date, the second due to a visa refusal from the Czechoslovak authorities. Their complete recordings for Decca, Philips and Deutsche Grammophon were released in a 37-disc set by Decca in 2015.
