= Arnold Jacob Wolf =

American rabbi and activist (1924-2008)

Rabbi Arnold Jacob Wolf

Personal life
- Born: March 19, 1924 Chicago, Illinois
- Died: December 23, 2008 (aged 84) Chicago, Illinois

Religious life
- Religion: Judaism
- Denomination: Reform

Jewish leader
- Position: Rabbi emeritus
- Synagogue: K.A.M. Isaiah Israel Temple
- Semikhah: Hebrew Union College

Rabbi Arnold Jacob Wolf (March 19, 1924 – December 23, 2008) was an American Reform Rabbi, and a longtime champion of peace and progressive politics.

== Biography ==
Wolf received an associate degree from the University of Chicago, a BA in philosophy from the University of Cincinnati. His rabbinical studies were at Hebrew Union College in Cincinnati and he was ordained in 1948. While at HUC, he served as secretary to Abraham Joshua Heschel.

He served a stint as an assistant to his uncle, Rabbi Felix A. Levy, at Temple Emanuel in Chicago, then he served as a Navy chaplain in Japan during the Korean War. A near crash in a seaplane that landed safely in the water was a life-altering experience.

=== Congregation Solel ===
In 1957 he helped launch Congregation Solel in Highland Park, Illinois, where he remained until 1972.

Rabbi Wolf marched in Selma, Ala., for civil rights and he traveled to Washington together with his temple members to protest the Vietnam War. In 1967, FBI agents attended and recorded one of his anti-war sermons.

Congregation Solel established an annual Holocaust remembrance weekend starting in the 1960s, making it one of the first synagogues in the United States to initiate the practice.

He was known for bringing speakers as diverse and contemporary as Rev. Martin Luther King Jr. and defendants in the Chicago Seven conspiracy trial.

He allowed his congregation to write its own prayer book and make decisions previously reserved for the rabbi. He endorsed the establishment of a membership cap at 400, which the congregation adopted, and banned bar mitzvahs.

=== Yale ===
After leaving Congregation Solel, Rabbi Wolf spent eight years as Jewish chaplain and Hillel director at Yale University, where he could have found an activist compatriot in Rev. William Sloane Coffin, the school's chaplain. In 1975 he was the first official Jewish representative ever invited to the World Council of Churches world assembly in Nairobi, Kenya

=== K.A.M. Isaiah Israel Temple ===
He led K.A.M. Isaiah Israel Temple in Kenwood, Chicago's oldest Jewish congregation, from 1980 to 2000.

Wolf received a Brotherhood Award for his civil rights work from the National Council of Christians and Jews in 1962. When the same group later gave a humanitarian award to then President Ronald Reagan, Rabbi Wolf returned his award, saying, "If Ronald Reagan is a humanitarian, then I’m not."

Rabbi Wolf celebrated his bar mitzvah at age 83, never having observed the rite at age 13 as Reform Judaism did not practice the ceremony at the time. The rabbi acknowledged that he was nervous about performing in public, as this was the first time he would be chanting the Torah. The celebrations included a series of lectures by Wolf and other rabbis.

Rabbi Wolf died at age 84 on December 23, 2008, in Chicago of an apparent heart attack.

=== Beliefs ===
He believed that "The core teaching of Torah for him had to do with justice, and one sometimes had to speak about that in ways that people didn't care to hear," and that "I am Adonai your God" was not a promise but a challenge to be lived up to every moment in every action."

He was the founder and leader of Breira, A Project of Concern in Diaspora-Israel Relations, which was in the 1970s a prominent organization for peace in the Middle East that supported a two-state solution to the Israeli-Palestinian conflict. Founded in 1973, the organization dissolved in 1977, having been the target of criticism from pro-Israel groups in the United States.

Writing in Commentary Magazine, Rabbi Wolf explains how a Jew must adapt to modernity. He writes that "modern thought is no enemy of the Jew. But he must become a Jew in order to have the stamina to meet it face on. Otherwise the secular Jewish liberal will … fall on his face. The courage to be present to the present absolutely requires, I believe, the enormous resource of Torah. Man without God may be tragic; the Jew against God is only pathetic."

=== Support for Barack Obama ===
He was vocal in his support for Barack Obama, whose home is across the street from the K.A.M. Isaiah Israel Temple where Rabbi Wolf served for decades.

Upon hearing of Rabbi Wolf’s death, President-elect Obama issued a statement, calling the rabbi a "dear friend," whose absence would be deeply felt in his hometown and beyond: "Throughout Chicago and in Jewish homes across our country, Rabbi Wolf’s name is synonymous with service, social action, and the possibility of change".

Rabbi Wolf had supported Obama's campaign for the Illinois Senate in 1996, telling him that "Mr. Obama, someday you will be vice president of the United States". Obama laughed, responding "Why vice president?"

== See also ==
- Everett Gendler
- Arthur Waskow
- Jewish Left
- Breira (organization)
- KAM Isaiah Israel

== Bibliography ==
- Unfinished Rabbi: Selected Writings of Arnold Jacob Wolf (1998)
- Jews For Obama
- "Against Spirituality". Judaism. 50 (3). Archived from the original on May 25, 2005 – via FindArticles.
