= Congregation Achduth Vesholom =

Reform synagogue in Fort Wayne, Indiana, United States

Coordinates: 41°02′09″N 85°09′06″W

- Location in Indiana

Religion
- Affiliation: Reform Judaism
- Ecclesiastical or organizational status: Synagogue
- Leadership: Rabbi Meir Bargeron
- Status: Active

Location
- Location: 5200 Old Mill Road, Fort Wayne, Indiana 46807
- Country: United States
- Interactive map of Congregation Achduth Vesholom

Architecture
- Type: Synagogue
- Style: Gothic Revival (1874)
- Established: 1848 (as a congregation)
- Completed: 1874 (Harrison and Wayne Sts.); 1917 (Wayne and Fairfield Sts.); 1961 (Old Mill Road)
- Construction cost: $25,000 (1874)

Website
- templecav.org

Congregation Achduth Vesholom (transliterated from Hebrew as "Unity and Peace") is a Reform Jewish congregation and synagogue, located at 5200 Old Mill Road in Fort Wayne, Indiana, in the United States. The building was listed on the National Register of Historic Places in 2026.

== History ==
Achduth Vesholom is the oldest congregation in Indiana, formed on October 26, 1848, as a German Orthodox congregation, called "The Society for Visiting the Sick and Burying the Dead". The congregation initially worshiped in private homes.

In 1857, the synagogue purchased the former German Methodist Church building on Harrison Street for $1,200 ($41,000 today), which was dedicated as a synagogue. The first rabbi was Joseph Solomon, who served until 1859. In 1861, the congregation adopted its current name.

On the corner of Harrison and Wayne Streets, the congregation built a Gothic Revival-style temple with seating for 800 people in 1874 at the cost of $25,000 (equivalent to $711,000 today); and in the same year the congregation joined the Union of American Hebrew Congregations. Tobias Schanfarber was rabbi from 1887 to 1888, followed by Adolf Guttmacher from 1889 to 1891 and Samuel Hirshberg from 1891 to 1895.

The congregation's third synagogue was completed in 1917, located at the corner of Wayne and Fairfield Streets; and it moved to 5200 Old Mill Road in 1961. In 1995, the synagogue hired a new rabbi, Sandford Kopnick, and Rabbi Meir Bargeron commenced on July 1, 2020, as the congregation's 24th spiritual leader.
