= Breira (organization) =

Left-wing political organization in Israel

Breira (full name "Breira: A Project of Concern in Diaspora-Israel Relations") was an organization founded to express a left-wing position on Israel. Formed in 1973, it lasted until 1977.

== History ==
Breira dissented from what it saw as the hard line Jewish organizational perspective that said there is no alternative in the aftermath of the Yom Kippur War. The group took the Hebrew name Breira—meaning "alternative"—in response to the cry of ein breira, or "there is no alternative."

In 1973, Rabbi Arnold Jacob Wolf served as founding chair of the movement. In its first public statement, Breira called for Israel to make territorial concessions and recognize the legitimacy of the national aspirations of the Palestinian people in order to achieve lasting peace. David Tulin was the vice-president, Inge Gibel was the treasurer. Rabbi Gerald Serotta was an active member. As its national chairman, Wolf stated that the name signified, "our desire for an alternative to the intransigence of both the PLO and the several governments of Israel." The group proposed a two state solution.

That year, Breira became a national membership organization of over one hundred Reform and Conservative rabbis and a number of important American Jewish writers and intellectuals, including Steven M. Cohen, Paul Cowan, Arthur Green, Irving Howe, Paula Hyman, Jack Nusan Porter, Henry Schwarzschild, John S. Ruskay, and Milton Viorst. Jewish counter-culture youths also helped to found Breira.

Michael E. Staub states, "Breira survived four tumultuous years. Its proposals on Israeli-Diaspora Jewish relations and Palestinian nationalism generated fierce international debate over the limits of public dissent and conflict in Jewish communal life, and virtually every major American Jewish organization took a public stand on the group and what it advocated."

There was an overlap of leadership with Americans for Progressive Israel. A full list of members was published in The National Jewish Post & Opinion, August 9, 1974. They published a journal called Interchange.

== Controversy ==
In July 1976, Spiro Agnew's organization, Education for Democracy, labeled them dangerous and "anti-Israel", even as Agnew himself was being accused of antisemitism and anti-Israel sentiment.

In December 1976, they agreed to meet with the PLO. Wolf stipulated that they meet as private individuals and that it be understood that they were not involved in any political negotiations. The initiative was supported by Jewish intellectuals Nathan Glazer and Irving Howe. Meeting representatives included Rabbi Max Ticktin and Arthur Waskow representing Breira, and the American Jewish Congress, B'nai B'rith, and the National Council of Jewish Women. Waskow wrote a widely circulated opinion piece about speaking to the PLO.

Also in December 1976, The Jerusalem Post ran a story portraying the organization as supporting terrorists, whereupon many members left the group. On February 20, 1977, when Breira held its first national membership conference in Chevy Chase, Maryland, the convention was attacked by Jewish Defense League members.

In May 1977, the Rabbinical Assembly of Conservative Judaism blocked two members of Breira, Wolf and Rabbi Everett Gendler, from membership in the organization's executive council. The RA felt that the organization was giving aid to Israel's enemies. At that time, according to The New York Times article, Breira had 1500 members.

Isaiah L. Kenen, the former American Israel Public Affairs Committee executive director, while still serving as the editor of its Near East Report, helped to label the group as "anti-Israel", "pro-PLO", and "self-hating Jews". Kenen charged that Breira "undermined U.S. support for Israel". Rabbi Alexander Schindler, president of the Union of American Hebrew Congregations, was the only major leader of a Jewish organization to defend Breira. He called the attack on Breira a "witch hunt". In his book, The Lobby: Jewish Political Power and American Foreign Policy, Edward Tivnan observed, "By attacking Breira, Jewish leaders had turned over much of their power to AIPAC, Israel's most loyal agent in the U.S. and a proved enemy of dissent from Israeli policies, among Jews as well as gentiles."

== See also ==
- Americans for Peace Now
- Arab-Israeli peace projects
- Peace Now

== Additional sources ==
- Torn at the Roots: The Crisis of Jewish Liberalism in Postwar America by Michael E. Staub
- The Road To Middle East Peace by Carolyn Toll Oppenheim
- Divided We Stand: American Jews, Israel, and the Peace Process by Ofira Seliktar
- "Washington Report on Middle East Affairs" (July 1992), pages 7–8, 89-91
