= Rosa Hochmann =

Russian-born violinist, teacher (1875–1955)

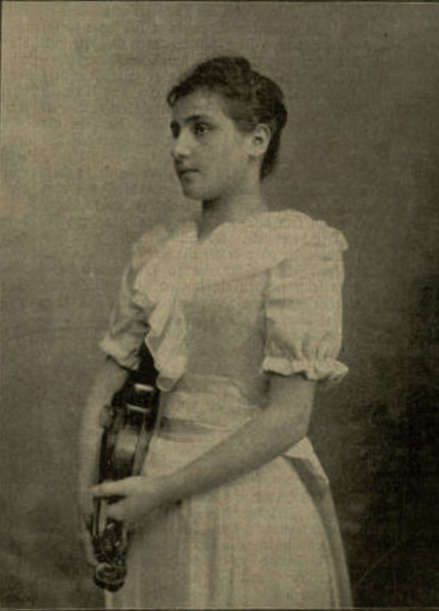
Rosa Hochmann, illustration in the Neue Musik-Zeitung 1893

Rosa Hochmann (March 13, 1875 – December 1955), was a violinist and violin teacher.

== Life ==
Hochmann was born in Proskurov, Russian Empire, now Khmelnytskyi, Ukraine. She was trained in Kiev by Oskar Stock. She moved to Vienna with her mother in 1885 and studied there from 1889 to 1891 at the conservatory with Jakob Grün who was concertmaster of the Vienna Court Opera. There is evidence of several concerts by Hochmann in Vienna in the 1890s, during which she performed, among others, the Violin Concerto No. 8 in A minor, Op. 47 by Louis Spohr, the Violin Concerto in G minor by Max Bruch, and solo works by Pablo de Sarasate, Carl Halir, and Henryk Wieniawski.

In 1894–95 she made concert tours to Budapest and Dresden as well as to Berlin, Warsaw, Magdeburg and Potsdam. She also gave concerts in Milan in 1896, again in Berlin in 1898, and in Saint Petersburg in 1900.

In Saint Petersburg, at the age of 25, Hochmann met the Jewish banker Felix Stransky, whom she married in Vienna in 1900. Felix Stransky was a member of the Konzerthaus management in Vienna from 1914 to 1938. The couple initially resided in Saint Petersburg, but then moved to Zurich, and from about 1905 the Hoffmann-Stransky family, now with two children, George Franz Kyrill and Claire Eugenie, lived in Vienna.

According to the social conventions of the time, marriage meant a withdrawal from public concert life for the violinist. After the marriage, only a few public concerts are documented, such as on November 6, 1901, at the Vienna Concert Association, on March 12, 1907, at the Vienna Conservatory on the occasion of Jakob Grün's 70th birthday, two symphony concerts in Vienna in the fall of 1907, and her participation in a charity concert on March 9, 1908, at the Musikvereinssaal, Vienna. The couple divorced in 1908. In 1907 she was awarded the Romanian medal of merit Bene Merenti first class for her artistic achievements.

In later years Hochmann worked primarily as a violin teacher, training Erika Morini and Norbert Brainin, among others.

Rosa Hochmann remarried with the banker Alfred Rosenfeld (1873 – c. 1941).

Hochmann managed to emigrate to the United States. She returned to Vienna after the Second World War where she died in 1955. Her first husband Felix Stransky was deported to the Theresienstadt concentration camp, but survived.
