= 92nd Street Y =

Community center in New York City

The 92nd Street Y, New York
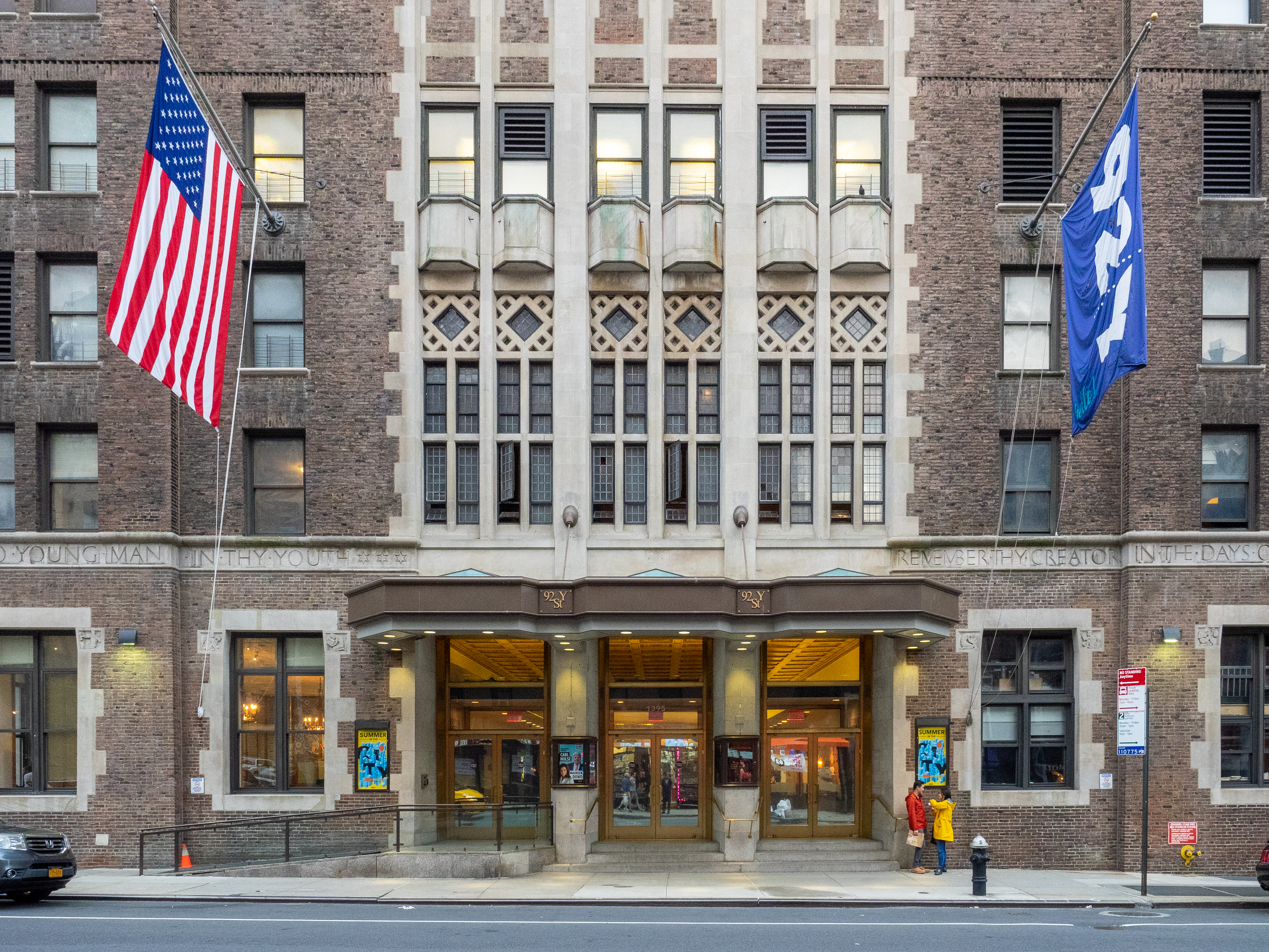
- Main entrance to 92NY, 2019

- Location within Manhattan Location within New York City Location within New York
- Location: 1395 Lexington Avenue, Manhattan, New York
- Coordinates: 40.7830°N 73.9527°W
- Type: Performing-arts center, YM-YWHA

Construction
- Opened: 1874 (original location)

Website
- 92ny.org

The 92nd Street Y, New York (92NY) is a cultural and community center located in the Carnegie Hill neighborhood of the Upper East Side of Manhattan in New York City, at the corner of East 92nd Street and Lexington Avenue. Founded in 1874 as the Young Men's Hebrew Association, 92NY transformed from a secular social club to a large arts and cultural center in the 20th century.

== History ==
In 1874, a group of German-Jewish professionals established the New York Young Men's Hebrew Association (YMHA). The founders were predominantly members of the Temple Shaaray Tefila, or synagogue, and New York's YMHA and others across the country grew out of existing Jewish congregations. The YMHA itself was a secular organization intended to serve as a social and literary fraternity. Officially incorporated on September 10, 1874, the YMHA would initially operate out of rented premises on 112 West 21st Street. A few years later, the organization would move to larger accommodations on 110 West 42nd Street; the Y also operated a downtown branch, where Emma Lazarus taught English to immigrants. This branch would later merge with other organizations to become the Educational Alliance.

As the organization grew, it began integrating more Judaism into its programming. In 1878, the YMHA held its first Hannakuh Festival, which became an annual tradition. The secularized celebration of Jewish holidays like Hannakuh and Purim, according to historian Jonathan Sarna, helped save the holiday from obscurity and was part of the creation of an American Jewish identity and culture. Celebrations of the High Holidays began in 1900. These were soon followed by regular Friday evening services that grew in average attendance from 172 in 1901 to more than 400 in 1903, though secular activities remained far more popular.

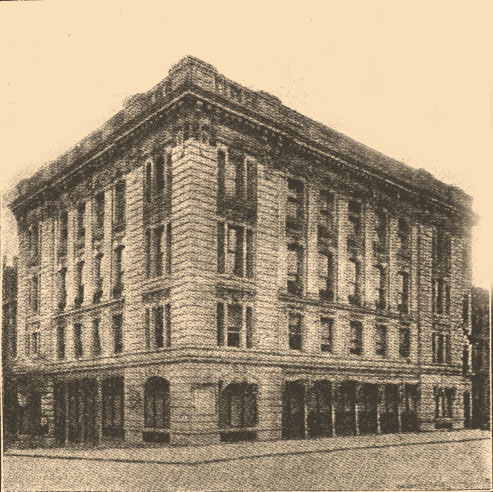
Former YMHA building at 92nd and Lexington Streets, built in 1900

In 1886 the YMHA moved from 42nd Street to 721 Lexington Avenue near 58th Street, and in 1895 to 111 East 59th Street. The Y would find a permanent home through the munificence of businessman and philanthropist Jacob Schiff. Initially donating a rowhouse at 65th Street and Lexington Avenue to the Y, Schiff would finance the construction of a new building at 92nd Street and Lexington. Designed by Arnold W. Brunner, who produced many turn-of-the-century synagogues, the new building would open in 1900.

The original YMHA building would be replaced by a new building, completed in 1930.

The YMHA primarily catered to Jews until the mid-1930s. The Y's director, William Kolodney, argued that the arts were central to the Jewish religious tradition of learning for learning's sake. While the board was concerned that this shift would transform the Y into a secular institution and harm its finances, Kolodney argued for not catering to the lowest common denominator in pursuit of crowds, and to keep charges minimal so that activities were within reach of salaried workers. Kolodney opened the Y's concert hall and events to nonmembers; its excellent acoustics helped land the Y on the map as a performing arts venue. The Y opened an arts center, jewelry center, dance center, poetry center, and nursery school throughout the 1930s. 75% of revenue was spent on 25% of programs. In 1945, the YMHA merged with the Young Women's Hebrew Association and became the YM-YWHA.

In the 1960s, the Clara de Hirsch Home for Working Girls merged with the Y, and a new building on the southern part of the block was constructed to house it and new spaces for programming and the arts. In 1972 the YM-YWHA rebranded itself as the 92nd Street Y.

In 1988, the Board elevated Sol Adler to executive director. Adler had worked for the Y for 11 years, hired by the previous executive director. In the 1990s, the decline of classical music programming and rising real estate costs threatened the Y's finances. The Y responded by cutting Jewish life and cultural offerings and expanding its class offerings. By 2003, the Y's budget had grown to $43 million and served 300,000 annually; less than a decade later, it had revenues of $80 million.

After the September 11th terrorist attacks, the Y spent $1 million investigating the feasibility of a satellite building to help revitalize the rebuilding downtown. The result was 92YTribeca, a performance space in the Tribeca neighborhood that opened in 2008. The venue at 200 Hudson Street contained a movie theater, lecture hall, cafe, and art gallery. The 92YTribeca location would be closed in 2013.

In February 2013, the Y fired Sal Taddeo, who served as director of facilities, after allegations were raised of a kickbacks scheme. Taddeo was the son-in-law of Catherine Marto, Adler's personal assistant; Marto was fired for being uncooperative in the investigation of Taddeo's conduct, and Adler was in turn fired after his affair with Marto was uncovered. Mr. Adler, who suffered depression, committed suicide by hanging. He was replaced by Henry Timms, formerly the Y's deputy executive director for innovation, strategy and content. Timms was the first non-Jewish director of the Y in its history, drawing some criticism; the Y announced the creation of a new director of Jewish community role, coinciding with Timms' elevation. Timms spearheaded the development of Giving Tuesday while at the Y.

Henry Timms left the Y in 2019 to join Lincoln Center; he was succeeded in January 2020 by Seth Pinsky, former head of economic development under Mayor Michael Bloomberg. The choice of Pinsky was influenced by the need to revamp the organization's outdated facilities. Shortly thereafter the institution was heavily impacted by the COVID-19 pandemic; nearly 70% of its revenues came from in-person events and instruction. The Y began streaming events and classes to reach a broader, global audience. Despite success online, budget cuts required employee furloughs and cut salaries.

As a result of shifting programming, the Y changed its name to the 92nd Street Y, New York (92NY for short) in 2022, reorganizing its programs under five umbrellas and launching Roundtable, an online learning platform. The rebrand preceded a $200 million campaign to renovate its facilities.

In October 2023, the poetry center indefinitely postponed its reading series after the Y canceled an appearance by the writer Viet Thanh Nguyen, citing his "public comments on Israel"; Nguyen had called for a ceasefire in the Gaza war earlier that week. The cancellation had prompted two of the poetry center's three employees to resign and many speakers to cancel.

== Activities ==
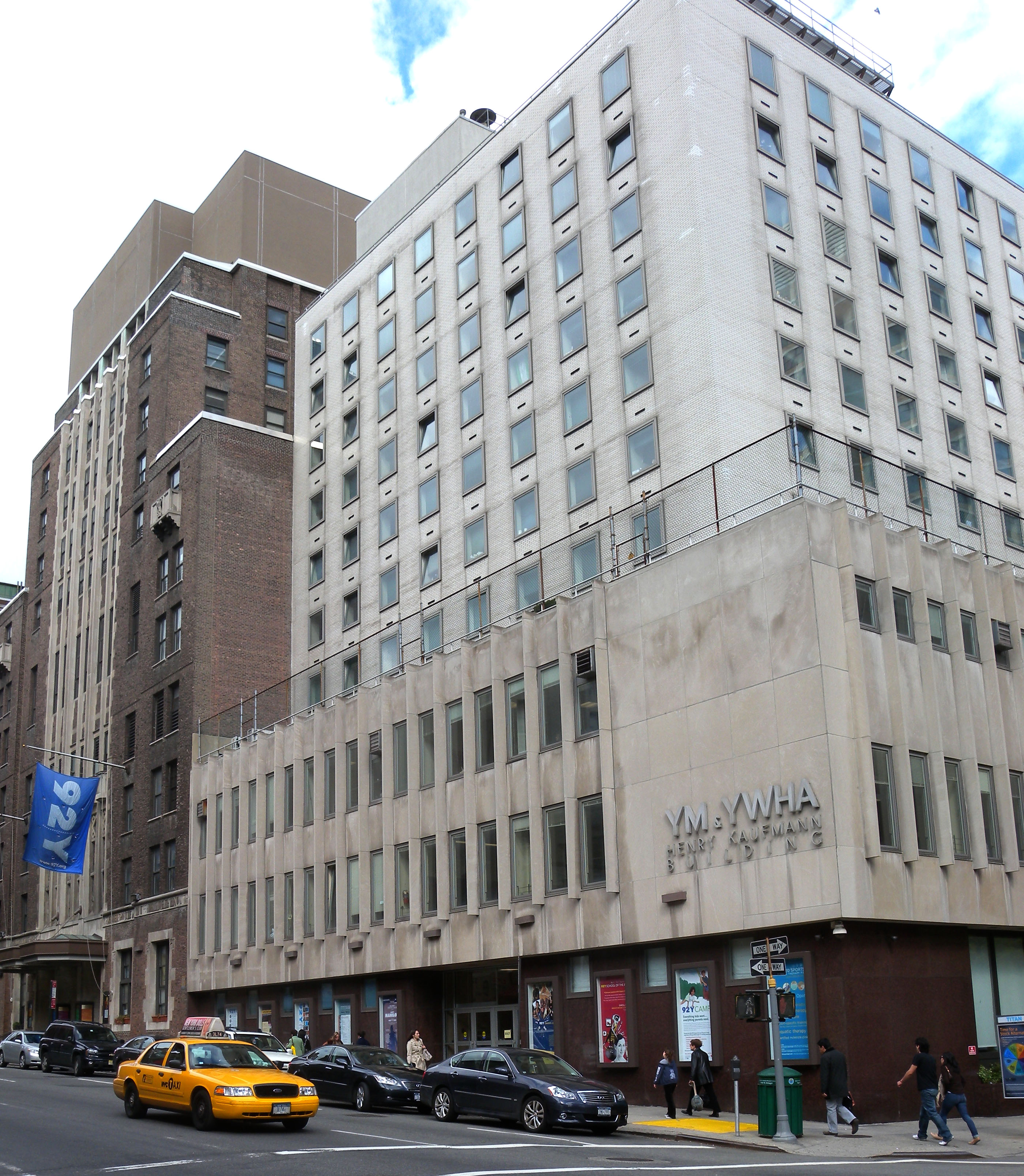
Kaufmann building

In addition to presenting performing arts programs (classical, jazz and popular music as well as dance performances), it offers a series of talks and conversations; literary readings; film screenings; adult education; schools for music, art and dance for children and adults; professional development programs (early childhood, dance, business and fashion); family, parenting and children's activities and classes; a nursery school; a senior center; a fitness center (including fitness classes and swim team); camps; a residence that rents rooms in the Y's main building at 92nd Street and Lexington Avenue; Jewish education, cultural and community programs; and educational outreach programs for public school children among its programs. The organization serves about 300,000 people annually in its New York facilities.

In recent years, 92Y has expanded its digital programming to include live webcasts of events and a free digital archive at 92YOnDemand.org that includes both stage events and web-only content. In 2012, 92Y founded #GivingTuesday, which established the Tuesday after Thanksgiving as a day to celebrate and encourage giving. The initiative was inspired by the core Jewish value of Tikkun olam (repairing the world) and reflects the institution's mission of reimagining community and giving back. 92Y is also one of the founding partners of the annual Social Good Summit, a conference that attracts NGO, tech and business leaders and entrepreneurs, which takes place in September (during UN Week).

== Programming centers ==
92nd Street Y comprises eight programming centers: Bronfman Center for Jewish Life; Lillian & Sol Goldman Family Center for Youth & Family; May Center for Health, Fitness & Sport; Milstein/Rosenthal Center for Media & Technology; School of the Arts; Charles Simon Center for Adult Life & Learning; Tisch Center for the Arts, Center for Educational Outreach and Center for Innovation and Social Impact.

In 1935, William Kolodney joined the 92nd Street Y as Educational Director, instituting a wide-ranging educational program for general audiences of all faiths. He made the "Y" a center for chamber music, poetry readings, and dance performances. He initiated the Y's dance center, School of Music and poetry center. The last is now called the Unterberg Poetry Center and has been led by prominent writers including American poet Karl Kirchwey who was director for thirteen years until 2000.

== Belfer Center for Innovation & Social Impact ==
The Belfer Center for Innovation & Social Impact brings the mission of 92nd Street Y to the world. Collaborators include the UN Foundation, Mashable, Hoover Institution at Stanford University, Harvard Kennedy School, Public Radio International, United Nations Entity for Gender Equality and the Empowerment of Women, the Bill and Melinda Gates Foundation, and the John Templeton Foundation.

== Notable guests ==
- Alvin Ailey American Dance Theater
- Al Pacino
- Aziz Ansari
- Alan Dershowitz
- Alec Baldwin
- Stephen Breyer
- Bo Burnham
- Richard Dawkins
- Tom Ford
- Ruth Bader Ginsburg
- Malcolm Gladwell
- Ira Glass
- Lewis Hamilton
- Don Henley
- Christopher Hitchens
- Billy Joel
- Karl Kirchwey
- Chaim Koppelman
- Ralph Macchio
- Rachel Maddow
- Paul McCartney
- Nas
- Jimmy Page
- Colin Quinn
- Jason Segel
- Joan Rivers
- Jon Stewart
- George St. Geegland and Gil Faizon (in character)
- Neil deGrasse Tyson
- Elie Wiesel
- Gene Wilder
- Bob Woodward

=== Residents ===
Notable individuals who have resided at 92nd Street Y include Joseph Gurwin (1920–2009), a philanthropist who rented a room at 92nd Street Y for four years after arriving in the U.S. Pianist Harry Connick Jr. lived there when he first moved to New York in 1985 at age 18.
