= Tobias Schanfarber =

Tobias Schanfarber (December 20, 1862 – March 4, 1942) was a Jewish-American rabbi who ministered in Chicago as rabbi and rabbi emeritus for over 40 years.

== Life ==
Schanfarer was born on December 20, 1862, in Cleveland, Ohio, the son of Aaron Schanfarber and Sara Newman. He attended the Cleveland public schools.

Schanfarber graduated from the University of Cincinnati with a B.A. in 1885 and was ordained a rabbi by Hebrew Union College in 1886. He also received an honorary Doctor of Hebrew Laws from Hebrew Union College in 1933, and he studied in the Johns Hopkins University Semitic Department under Professor Paul Haupt from 1894 to 1898. He served as rabbi of Shomer Emunim (Toledo, Ohio) from 1886 to 1887, Congregation Achduth Vesholom (Fort Wayne, Indiana) from 1887 to 1888, Har Sinai Congregation (Baltimore, Maryland) from 1888 to 1898, and Congregation Sha'arai Shomayim (Mobile, Alabama) from 1899 to 1901.

In 1901, Schanfarber became rabbi of Kehilath Anshe Ma'arav in Chicago, Illinois. He served as rabbi there until 1926, when he became rabbi emeritus. He helped form congregations, in Gary, Indiana, Hammond, Indiana, and Chicago as regional director of District 26 of the Synagogue and School Extension Department. He was also corresponding secretary and treasurer of the Central Conference of American Rabbis, president of the Chicago Rabbinical Association, vice-president of the Illinois Vigilance Society, and a member of the American Peace Society, the Peoples Institute of Chicago, and the Oriental Society. In Chicago, he was co-editor of The Reform Advocate and editor of The Chicago Israelite and The Sentinel.

Schanfarber was part of the first-generation of American-trained rabbis and was a disciple of Isaac Mayer Wise. Early in his rabbinic career, he supported a more radical form of Reform Judaism like having Shabbat services on Sunday instead of Saturday. But by his later years he had a more moderate view on observance and opposed "secularism" that sought to remove God and the Torah from Jewish life. One source described him as "a cultured gentleman, liberal in thought, though of great strength in his convictions, and a gifted orator on almost any subject which the public man is called upon to deal with."

In 1890, Schanfarber married Carrie Philllipson, a founder of the Miriam Club for Jewish working girls. They had no children.

Schanfarber died in his winter home Miami, Florida on March 4, 1942, less than twelve hours after his sister Mrs. Max Herzberg also died in the winter home. His funeral was held at KAM, with his nephew by marriage Rabbi Felix A. Levy delivering the funeral sermon and Rabbi Jacob J. Weinstein of KAM officiating. He was buried in Mount Maryiv Cemetery.
