= Edith Farnadi =

Hungarian pianist (1911–1973)

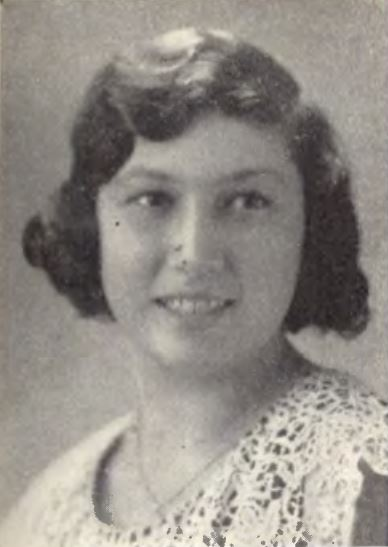

Background information
- Born: September 25, 1911 Budapest, Hungary
- Died: December 14, 1973 (aged 62)
- Occupation(s): Pianist, Professor
- Years active: 1930s–1973

Edith Farnadi (25 September 1911 – 14 December 1973) was a Hungarian pianist.

She was born in Budapest and began her studies at the age of 7 at the Franz Liszt Academy of Music. She studied with Professor Arnold Székely (also a teacher of Louis Kentner). At the age of 9, she made her musical debut as a child prodigy. At the age of 12, she played Beethoven's Piano Concerto No. 1, directing the orchestra from the piano. She received her diploma from the Musical Academy in Budapest when she was 17 years old. During her studies at the Music Academy she won the Franz Liszt Prize twice. She became a professor at the Budapest Franz Liszt Academy where she remained until 1942. She then concertized widely throughout Europe in the 1950s and made recordings with the Westminster Label. In ensemble she performed with the Barylli Quartet.

It was while still a student in Budapest that she became a steady musical partner with the great Hungarian violinist Jenő Hubay. At the International Musical afternoons at the Budapest Palais, she performed many times with Bronisław Huberman and Tibor Varga.

In 1946 she went to Austria, where she regularly gave concerts in Western Europe. In the last decade of her life she taught in Graz, and recorded all the piano works of Kodály and Bartók. She also appeared as a guest in Hungary from the 1960s. She performed for the last time in 1972.

== Partial discography ==
- Tchaikovsky Piano Concertos No. 1 & 2 - Westminster LP WL 5309, 1954
- Liszt Piano Concertos No. 1 & 2 - Westminster LP WL 5158
- Liszt Hungarian Rhapsodies Vol. 1 (1-8) - Westminster LP WAL 213
- Dvorak Piano Quintet with the Barylli Quartet - Westminster W 9025
- Rachmaninoff, Piano Concerto No.2 in C Minor, Opus 18 - Westminster LP XWN 18275 (Probably mid-1950s)
- Bartók, sonata for violin and piano No. 1 with Tibor Varga - Deutsche Grammophon – 415 995-1. Philharmonia (3) – PA 139 V17G017
