= Erika Morini =

Austrian violinist (1904–1995)

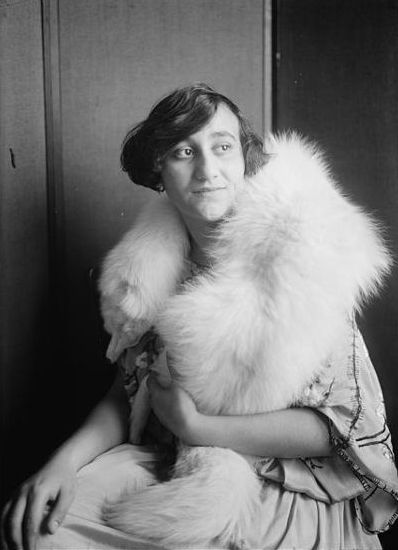
- Morini in the early 1920s

Background information
- Born: January 5, 1904; Vienna, Austria
- Died: November 1, 1995 (aged 91) New York City, New York, U.S.
- Genre: Classical
- Occupation: Violinist
- Instrument: Violin
- Years active: 1916–1976

Erika Morini Siracusano (January 5, 1904 – October 31 or November 1, 1995) was an Austrian and American violinist.

== Early life and family ==
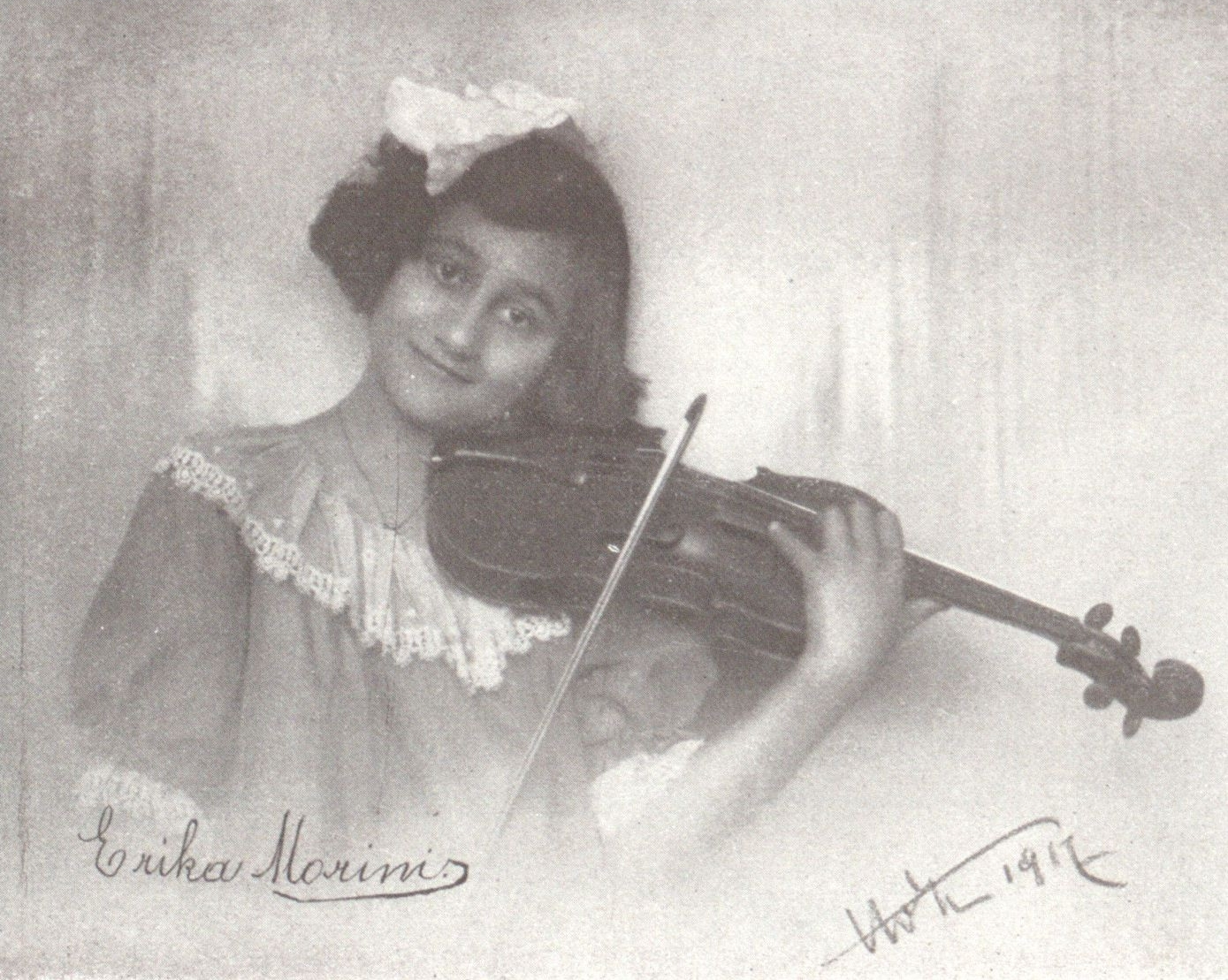
Morini as child prodigy in 1917

Morini was born in Vienna, and received her first instruction from her father, Oscar Morini (originally spelled Oser or Ojser, family name Moritz), who was the director of his own music school in Vienna, and from Rosa Hochmann. She completed her studies at the Vienna Conservatory under Otakar Ševčík, who was also the teacher of Jan Kubelik.

Erika's mother was Malka Morini, née Weissmann. Her father was born at Czernowitz in Bukovina, which was then part of the Austro-Hungarian Empire. Morini had six siblings: Alice, a pianist; Stella, violinist; Haydee, dancer; Frank, art dealer; and Albert Morini, impresario concert manager. Her cousin, Louis Morris (originally Moritz), was a clarinetist for John Philip Sousa's band (1907–1921).

== Career ==
When she made her début in 1916, with the Leipzig Gewandhaus Orchestra and the Berlin Philharmonic, under Arthur Nikisch, the critics made no allowance for her youth, but spoke of her work as the equal of that of the most famous of the younger generation of violinists. On the voyage from Europe to New York, Morini and her cousin Louis played violin and clarinet for the first-class passengers aboard the ship, and were given first-class accommodations on account of their popularity. Her American début at the age of seventeen in New York City on January 26, 1921 was one of the musical sensations of the year. Shortly after her New York début, she was presented with the Guadagnini violin which had been owned by the American violinist Maud Powell, who had died in 1920. In March 1921, Morini made her first recordings for the Victor Talking Machine Company in Camden, New Jersey, accompanied on the piano by her sister, Alice. She made her first visit to London in 1923.

She resided in Austria until 1938, when she relocated to New York and began spelling her first name 'Erica'. she continued to make regular concert appearances and taught at the Mannes College of Music. In 1962, she and Isaac Stern, Zino Francescatti and Nathan Milstein appeared in a memorial concert for violinist Fritz Kreisler.

Along with the Guadagnini violin, Morini also played the "Davidov" Stradivarius violin from the year 1727, named for the Russian cellist Karl Davydov. Morini’s father had purchased it for her in Paris in 1924 for $10,000.

Harold C. Schonberg, music critic of The New York Times, once described Morini as "probably the greatest woman violinist who ever lived", though that notion was not one that pleased her. "A violinist is a violinist", she said, "and I am to be judged as one – not as a female musician."

It was as a musician pure and simple that she earned consistently enthusiastic reviews. After a 10-year hiatus from the New York concert stage, she returned in 1976 to give a final recital at Hunter College; Donal Henahan wrote in The New York Times that the concert was "one of the most musically satisfying of this season". Following this concert, she retired from the stage and reportedly never played the violin again.

Morini's valuable Davidov Stradivarius (as well as paintings, letters, and her scores, complete with fingerings and other valuable notes) were stolen from her New York City apartment shortly before her death in October 1995, at the age of 91. She had been hospitalized with heart disease and was never told of the theft. The crime remains unsolved.

== Legacy ==
Morini is believed to be the last surviving recording artist who made acoustically recorded Red Seal Records for the Victor Talking Machine Company. Four months after her death, Morini was described in the journal The Strad as the “most bewitching woman violinist of this century”.

She was particularly admired for her performances of the concerto repertory, especially the concertos of Louis Spohr, which she helped restore to popularity. She also played and recorded the great concertos of Mozart, Beethoven, Mendelssohn, Brahms, Bruch and Tchaikovsky.

Morini was honored with numerous awards and prizes. She received honorary doctorates from Smith College, Massachusetts, in 1955, and from the New England Conservatory of Music, Boston, in 1963. New York City, where she died, honored her lifetime achievement with a gold medal in 1976. Although Morini was considered one of the finest violinists of the past century, she is largely forgotten today.

A stage play about Morini, The Morini Strad by Willy Holtzman, had its world premiere in 2010.
