= Joseph Gurwin =

Joseph Gurwin (June 13, 1920 – September 24, 2009) was a Lithuanian-born American textile executive who became a philanthropist who contributed to Jewish causes in the United States and Israel. Gurwin arrived in the U.S. with little in his pocket, built his fortune manufacturing specialized textiles for the United States armed forces, gave much of his money to charity and then lost significant sums that had been invested with Bernard Madoff.

== Early life ==
Born Joseph Gurwich in a Lithuanian Jewish family in Kovno, Lithuania on June 13, 1920, he immigrated to the United States in 1934 to avoid the prospect of being forced to repeat a grade after failing both Latin and Lithuanian language, having focused more on soccer than on his schoolwork. His family remained in Lithuania and both of his parents were killed in the Holocaust. His younger brother, Chaim, was the family's lone survivor, but he was caught behind the Iron Curtain after the end of World War II, and the two did not meet for 52 years until they were reunited in Tel Aviv in 1988. He served in the United States Army during World War II.

== Business and philanthropy ==
He spent four years in a room he rented for $14 a month at the 92nd Street Y in Manhattan. By the time he moved out, he owned a car and was paying more than that to garage it. He dropped out of City College of New York after his uncle's military supply firm made him a partner in 1941. He created Kings Point Industries in 1959, and became wealthy through his firm, which manufactured ballistic vests, Gas mask hoods and parachute equipment.

In the succeeding decades, Gurwin devoted much of his time to charitable efforts, giving personally and through charitable trusts, focusing on the causes related to the elderly, education, medical and scientific research. Substantial amounts were contributed to fund the Rosalind and Joseph Gurwin Jewish Geriatric Center of Long Island. He contributed to the Weizmann Institute of Science and Technion – Israel Institute of Technology to fund research in Israel. A pair of satellites launched by the Israel Space Agency for Technion, Gurwin-1b in 1998 and Gurwin-2-TechSAT, were named for him after he provided the funds to pay for launching the devices into space.

He was among the founders of the United States Holocaust Memorial Museum, located adjacent to the National Mall in Washington, D.C. He led the UJA-Federation of New York from 1988 to 1991 as its chairman.

Gurwin had invested much of the funds of his charitable trusts with Bernie Madoff and lost an estimated $36 million in assets in these funds after the collapse of Madoff's investment fund. He continued making contributions from his own funds and stated that he was willing "to sell apples on the street" in order to continue his giving. At a meeting in Palm Beach in early 2009 of prominent community members who had lost much to Madoff, Gurwin made an impassioned appeal that "no matter what happened to us, we still have to support those who are less fortunate than ourselves".

== Death ==
Gurwin died on September 24, 2009, at age 89 in Manhattan due to congestive heart failure. He had lived there and also had homes in Southampton, New York and Palm Beach, Florida. He was survived by his second wife, the former Phyllis Pressman. He was also survived by a daughter and son from his first marriage, to the former Rosalind Brizel.
