= Florizel von Reuter =

American-born violinist and composer

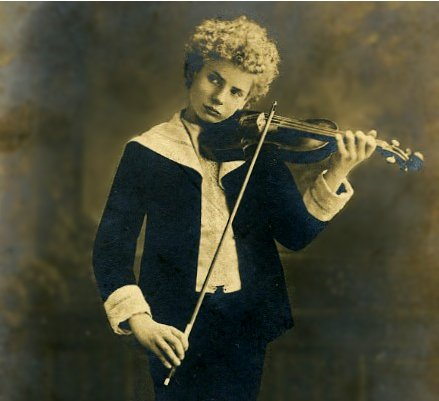
Stereoscope of Florizel von Reuter, ca. 1911, Stereostopic Co.

Florizel von Reuter (21 January 1890 – 10 May 1985) was an American-born violinist and composer, a child prodigy who went on to an adult career, mainly in Germany, as distinguished soloist and teacher of violin. He was also a psychic and medium and the author of several books on his alleged mediumistic communications with deceased musicians, and other works.

== Early life ==
Born on 21 January 1890, Florizel Reuter at Davenport, Iowa, U.S., he was the son of Jacob and Grace Reuter. His father was a musician and minor composer. Florizel had his first violin lessons with his mother. He showed extraordinary talent at a very young age, and went to London to study in 1899. He was taught by Max Bendix, Emile Sauret (who had also taught his father Jacob), César Thomson and Henri Marteau. In 1901 he graduated from the Geneva Conservatory, where there was a debate as to whether he should be allowed to graduate (presumably owing to his age). Several teachers refused to graduate any other pupils unless he was approved, and so the matter was settled.

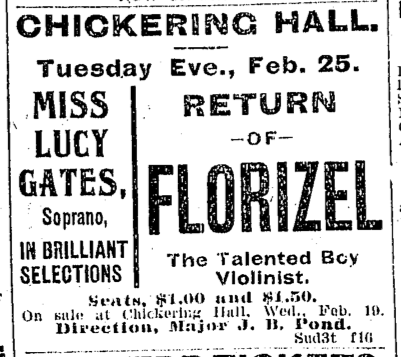
Advertisement for concert at Boston's Chickering Hall, USA, 1902

His first professional concert was at La Chaux-de-Fonds in Switzerland in 1900. After giving 30 concerts in that country he began to tour in America, where he was introduced as a protégé of Joseph Joachim's. However, much of his early career was spent performing and teaching in Europe.

== Young adulthood ==
The name "von Reuter" was adopted in connection with his European career, as a significator of German aristocracy. In c 1916–1917 he became Director of the Zurich Music Academy. He retained his U.S. citizenship despite spending much of the following two decades in Europe. He published a useful introduction to the study and analysis of solo violin music, Führer durch die solo-Violinmusik, eine Skizze ihrer Entstehung und Entwicklung mit kritischer Betrachtung ihrer Hauptwerke (M. Hesse, 1926).

=== Psychic messages ===
During the 1920s his mother, Grace Reuter, developed apparent psychic powers by receiving supposed spirit messages through automatic writing. Florizel became closely involved with this and acted as a medium and as recorder of the findings, which were first described in The Psychic Experiences of a Musician (in Search of Truth) (1928) — with a foreword by writer Arthur Conan Doyle — and in its sequel The Consoling Angel (1930). These in particular described conversations with famous deceased musicians. His first important claimed contacts were Paganini and Pablo de Sarasate, and also the late Professor Heinrich Barth of Berlin. Messages were delivered through a type of planchette called an "Additor", used originally by his mother, and many of them were spelled out backwards.

He contributed an essay on "Nature Spirits" to the 1928 revised edition of Arthur Conan Doyle's The Coming of the Fairies, p. 156–157, and was associated with Baron von Schrenck-Notzing in a series of experiments with the Schneider brothers.

Other messages followed claiming to be from Giuseppe Tartini, Pietro Locatelli, Karol Lipiński, Pierre Baillot, Charles Auguste de Bériot, Henri Vieuxtemps, Joseph Joachim (who was also supposed to have sent etheric messages to his relatives Jelly d'Arányi and Adila Fachiri), Ferdinand Hérold, Édouard Lalo, Max Reger, Nikolai Rimsky-Korsakov and Edvard Grieg. While rehearsing particularly difficult Paganini études Florizel found he was compelled to adopt entirely new fingerings as if guided by an external intelligence. His philosophical exchanges with the spirits are described in his book A Musician's Talks with Unseen Friends (London, Rider 1931).

=== Performance, teaching and recordings ===
From 1931 to 1933 he was professor of violin at the Vienna Music Academy. Through the 1930s he maintained a teaching and performance career, mainly in Germany and principally at Munich. He made various solo recordings for Polydor Records, and also chamber ensemble works (in 1935–1936) with Elly Ney, Max Strub (violin), Walter Trampler (viola), Ludwig Hoelscher (cello), (the second manifestation of the Strub String Quartet) and under the direction of Willem van Hoogstraten, husband of Elly Ney. (Ney, Hoelscher and Strub had formed the Elly Ney Trio in 1932.) It was in this period, at Munich, that he taught the young Walter Barylli, whom (aged 15) he invited into his own home as a resident guest so that he could afford to receive violin instruction. Von Reuter also composed more than 50 original works of music, including scores, tone poems, and four operas.

== Later career ==
Von Reuter remained in Germany during the War and until the late 1940s, when he returned to the U.S. He settled in Waukesha, Wisconsin and became Concertmaster of the Waukesha Symphony Orchestra, still teaching into the early 1980s. During the 1970s and 1980s he gave many "farewell performances."

Von Reuter died in his sleep on May 10, 1985.

== Publications ==
He wrote the books:

- The Psychic Experiences of a Musician (1928)
- The Consoling Angel (1928)
- A Musician Talks With Unseen Friends (Rider, 1931)
- Great People I Have Known (Freeman Printing, 1961)
- The Twilight of the Gods (Hitler's Berlin: A Novel, by an American Who Experienced It (Cultural Press, 1962)
- Maiden Worlds Unconquered, Eleven Fiction Tales of Love Through the Ages (Cultural Press, 1967)
- The Master From Afar: A Flight into the Past as it Might Have Been (Carlton Press, 1972)

== Selected compositions ==
- Sinfonie Royale (1904)
- Chanson triste for Violin and Piano (1909)
- Danses roumaines for Violin and Orchestra, Op.2 No.1 (1909)
- Suite after Caprices of Pietro Locatelli for Violin Solo (1925)
- Variations on a Funeral March (Original Theme) for Violin Solo (1925)
- A Portrait Gallery, for violin and orchestra (1926)
- Old American Negro Songs for Violin and Piano (1931)
- Symphonic Rhapsody for violin and orchestra (completion of the unfinished last composition Andante und Rondo capriccioso by Max Reger) (1932)
- Violin concerto No.1 (1933)
- Rhapsody for violin and orchestra (1940)
- Violin concerto No.2 (1958)
- Concerto grosso for 2 violins and orchestra (1966)
- Scottish rhapsody for violin and orchestra

== Documents ==
- Letters by Florizel von Reuter in the State Archives in Leipzig, company archives of the Music Publishing House C.F.Peters (Leipzig).
