= Antoine-Pierre de Bavier =

Antoine-Pierre de Bavier Anton von Bavier
- Also known as: Antoine de Bavier
- Origin: Switzerland
- Occupations: Clarinettist, conductor
- Instrument: Clarinet

Antoine-Pierre de Bavier, also known as Antoine de Bavier and Anton von Bavier (September 9, 1919 - September 13, 2004) was a twentieth-century Swiss clarinettist and orchestral conductor.

De Bavier was a pupil of the clarinetist Luigi Amodio and Wilhelm Furtwängler. His earlier career was dedicated more particularly to his instrumental work as a clarinettist. He collaborated with the Végh Quartet in their early recording of the Brahms clarinet quintet, and was among the very few soloists to have worked and recorded with the Quartetto Italiano, with whom in 1952 he recorded the Mozart clarinet quintet. In 1956 he made a landmark recording of the Brahms clarinet sonatas.

A live recording exists of his performance of the Mozart quintet with the Barylli Quartet at the Salzburg Festival in 1956. In that year he was also conducting in Mexico City, for instance, in a performance of the Mozart flute and harp concerto with Gildardo Mojica (flute) and Judith Flores Alatorre (harp). He was for a time conductor of the Bilbao Symphony Orchestra. During the fifties, due to health problems, he was forced to leave his brilliant soloist career. He was persuaded by Wilhelm Furtwängler to start a new musical life as a conductor. As a matter of fact, he conducted important orchestras and worked with great soloists, among which the famous Italian pianist Arturo Benedetti Michelangeli (four concerts in Germany and Italy, from 1956 to 1961).

De Bavier taught chamber music at the Salzburg Mozarteum and the Accademia Musicale Chigiana in Siena (Italy), and was on the international jury for German radio competitions. He gave concerts in the most famous European and American cities.

Later in his career de Bavier became particularly associated as conductor with the Suk Chamber Orchestra of Prague. At the Settimane Internazionale di Musica da Camera at Kastelruth (Bolzano) in 1997 and 1999 (the XII and XIV Settimane) he was the guest conductor, on the former occasion dedicating the festival to the work of J.S. Bach. Similarly he took the Prague Chamber Orchestra, with Mirjam Tschopp as solo violinist, to the Teatro Filarmonico at Brescia (a Mozart concert), and conducted Mirjam and Sibylle Tschopp with the Filarmonica at Verona in 2002.

De Bavier conducted a performance of Mozart's serenade the 'Gran Partita' (K 361) at Villa Arvedi in Cuzzaro, Grezzana, with a company of distinguished international instrumentalists, issued in 1999.
