= Remy Prìncipe =

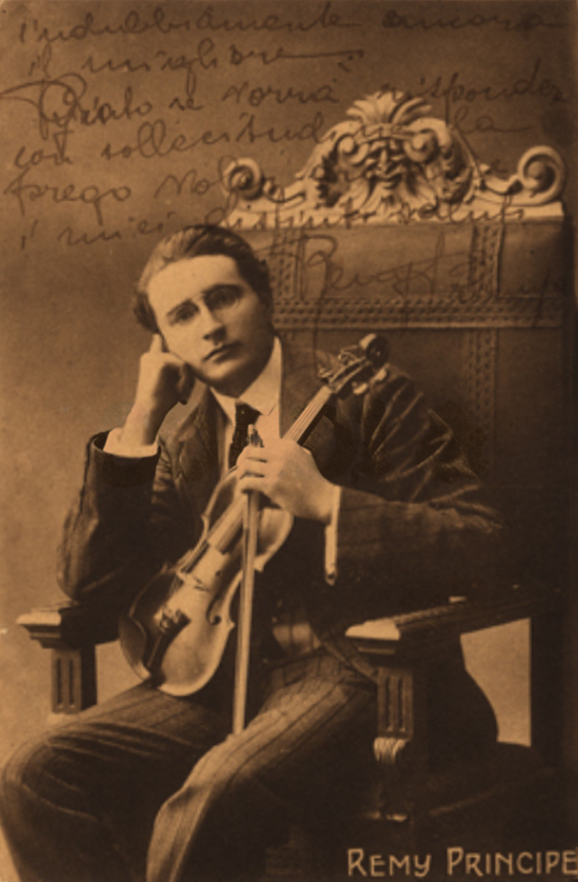
Remy Principe, 1918

Remy Prìncipe (born Remigio Prìncipe, 25 August 1889 in Venice; died 5 December 1977 in Rome) was an Italian composer, violinist, and music educator. In addition to his work teaching, and performing as a soloist, he made valuable contributions to the founding of the first Italian chamber orchestras from 1947 onwards.

== Life and work ==
Remy Prìncipe studied with Francesco de Guarnieri in Venice. He completed postgraduate studies with Theodor Kilian in Munich and with Lucien Capet in Paris.

In 1921 he premiered the violin concerto by Riccardo Zandonai.

In 1922 he gave the world premiere performance of the Berceuse sur le nom de Gabriel Fauré, with the composer, Maurice Ravel, at the piano.

From 1928 to 1942, he served as concertmaster of the Orchestra of the Augusteo in Rome. During this time, he formed the Trio Italiano with pianist Nino Rossi (1895–1952) and cellist Benedetto Mazzacurati. Together with Ettore Gandini, Giuseppe Matteucci, and Luigi Chiarappa, he founded the Quartetto Italiano. He was also involved in the founding of the chamber orchestras I Virtuosi di Roma and, in 1952, I Musici di Roma.

He began his career as a violin teacher in Pesaro, continuing this career from 1921 at the Accademia di Santa Cecilia in Rome, from 1945 to 1946 at the Accademia Musicale Chigiana in Siena, and in 1947 in Ankara, before returning to the Academia Nazionale di Santa Cecilia in Rome and finally moving to the Venice Conservatory in 1956. Remy Prìncipe played a crucial role in the training of an entire generation of Italian violinists.

He published the instructional work Il violino (Milan 1926, new edition 1951) together with Giulio Pasquali. He published his own arrangements of Rodolphe Kreutzer's 40 études ou caprices for violin. He wrote two violin concertos, a suite for violin and orchestra, and pieces for violin and piano.

== Literature ==
- Prìncipe, Remy. In: Alain Pâris: Classical Music in the 20th Century, Instrumentalists, Singers, Conductors, Orchestras, Choirs. 2nd edition. dtv, Munich 1997, ISBN 3-423-32501-1, p. 625.
- Prìncipe, Remy. In: Carl Dahlhaus (ed.): Riemann Musiklexikon. 12th, completely revised edition. Biographical section: L–Z, supplementary volume. Schott, Mainz 1975, p. 416.
