= KAM Isaiah Israel =

Reform synagogue in Chicago, Illinois, United States

- Hebrew: קהלת אנשי מערב
- KAM synagogue building, in 2021

- Location in Chicago, Illinois

Religion
- Affiliation: Reform Judaism
- Ecclesiastical or organisational status: Synagogue
- Leadership: Rabbi Daniel Kirzane Cantor David Berger
- Status: Active

Location
- Location: 1100 East Hyde Park Boulevard, Chicago, Illinois
- Country: United States
- Coordinates: 41°48′9.5″N 87°35′55″W

Architecture
- Architects: Alfred S. Alschuler; John Alschuler; Ron Dirsmith
- Type: Synagogue
- Style: Byzantine Revival
- Established: 1847 (as a congregation)
- Completed: 1924

Specifications
- Direction of façade: West
- Capacity: 1,300 (sanctuary); 400 (chapel)
- Domes: Three (1 large; 2 small)
- Spire: One (reminiscent of a minaret)
- Chicago Landmark
- Designated: June 9, 1977

Website
- kamii.org

KAM Isaiah Israel is a Reform Jewish congregation and synagogue located at 1100 East Hyde Park Boulevard in the historic Kenwood neighborhood of Chicago, Illinois, in the United States. It is the oldest Jewish congregation in Chicago, with its oldest core founded in 1847 as Kehilath Anshe Ma'arav (Hebrew: קהלת אנשי מערב, lit. 'Congregation of the Men of the West').

== History ==
The congregation Kehilath Anshe Ma'arav ("Congregation of the Men of the West") was founded on November 3, 1847, at the wholesale dry-goods store of Levi Rosenfeld and Jacob Rosenberg located at 155 East Lake Street by twenty men, many of whom hailed from Bavaria. At the time, this section of the Chicago Loop was the center of the small Chicago Jewish community. The newly founded congregation was first housed above Rosenfeld and Rosenberg's store at Lake and Wells street. After increasing membership and lack of space, the congregation was soon forced to find a more suitable space to accommodate their growing community. A lot was leased at Clark and Quincy streets (now the site of the Kluczynski Federal Building), and construction of a small frame synagogue began. After an investment of $12,000, the one and a half story building, with a capacity of 450 people, was dedicated on June 13, 1851. After only two years, their land lease had expired, forcing the congregation to move the new building to Adams and Wells in 1853. Unscathed by the Great Chicago Fire of 1871, KAM's synagogue building was burned down in the Chicago Fire of 1874.

In 1890, KAM moved into its Louis Sullivan and Dankmar Adler designed temple in Bronzeville, and in 1924 moved again to a new building. The former synagogue became the Pilgrim Baptist Church. In 1971, KAM merged with the Isaiah Israel Reform congregation to become KAM Isaiah Israel.

== Building ==
The synagogue is situated in the Kenwood neighborhood of Chicago, an area known for its large homes and high-profile residents such as Barack Obama and Muhammad Ali.

Built in the Byzantine Revival style, the minaret is not on top of the dome, but rather it is atop a tower that functions as a chimney, behind the building. Built for the Isaiah Israel congregation in 1924, the structure was designed by Alfred S. Alschuler, who drew his influence from photographs of the second-century Severus synagogue unearthed at Tiberias, in Galilee. The building's large dome is covered with Ludowici clay tiles.

Later additions were designed by architects John Alschuler (the son of Alfred) and Ron Dirsmith. The building was designated an official Chicago Landmark on June 9, 1977.

== Religious development and Reform identity ==
=== Early Orthodox beginnings (1847–1850s) ===
KAM Isaiah Israel is the oldest Jewish congregation in Illinois, with its founding predating any other synagogue in the state by several years. Many of the German Jewish immigrants responsible for the founding of the congregation, a group which did not exceed twenty in number, initially maintained Orthodox practices.

During its early years, the congregation adhered to traditional Jewish observance. They adopted Minhag Ashkenaz as the ritual for the synagogue at the time it was founded. The congregation's first rabbi was Ignatz Kunreuther, serving as a leader of the congregation from 1847 to 1853. His views were described as "ultra orthodox … holding tenaciously to ancient traditional usages," serving as an overall picture for this early period during its foundings. Despite these traditional perspectives, Kunreuther was likewise described as keeping an open mind as well as being a good Talmudic scholar who is well-versed in Hebrew literature.

The early constitution adopted in 1847 established a traditional governance structure with Morris L. Leopold as the first president. The congregation's commitment to Orthodox practice expanded beyond its worship, going into topics such as maintaining kosher dietary laws. For instance, one founding member, Mrs. Dila Kohn, reportedly subsisted "for a time on a vegetable diet, eating only bread, potatoes, eggs and the like" when no shochet was available in the community.

=== Early Reform tensions and gradual change (1852–1860s) ===
Seeds of reform started early in KAM's long history. Internal debates of ritual changes started in 1852, when record notes show that demands for reforms at service became louder at this time. Some of these reforms adopted included the abolition of the ritual of Piyutim and Selichoth, singing of hymns in the vernacular of the country, and the accompanying of the singing by playing the organ, among others.

These early reforms did not go by unpassed and did face some criticisms, particularly from the founders who advanced slowly and cautiously, always endeavoring to remain within the lines of conservatism. However, the newer members considered this cautious conservatism too slow for their liking, and it was not until the late 1850s that it intensified under prominent reform advocates like Dr. David Einhorn. With his eloquent speech and fervor, he was able to inspire many in Chicago through the journal Sinai. This led to the formation of a short-lived reform congregation called "Ohabe Or" in 1858, and eventually to the establishment of Sinai Congregation in 1861 when twenty-six members seceded from K. A. M.

=== The Liebman Adler era and moderate Reform (1861-1883) ===
Along with the flourishing of Reform Judaism elsewhere, the 1860s were also a pivotal moment of change for the congregation under Rabbi Liebman Adler, who served from 1861 to 1883. While being described as "consistently conservative" and clinging to old-time costumes and usages, Rabbi Adler also understood the demands of modern times and was tolerant to the claims of the younger generation. This allowed him to serve as a bridge between the congregation's Orthodox origins and its reform aspirations.

Adler's published sermons serve as a primary source of reference in understanding his moderate approach to Reform. Arguing for both literal and allegorical interpretation of Biblical texts, he is quoted as stating "when the Bible commands and forbids, there is no room for subtle interpretations," but "when the Bible clothes its teachings in tales and parables, we agree with Rashi that the words themselves cry out, 'Explain me!'" This balanced approach between strict interpretations and more flexible readings that allow for reform showcase the bridge he built between the old and the new.

This alignment with some of the main hallmarks of Reform Judaism is further portrayed in Liebman Adler through his view of Jewish versure national identity. More specifically, Adler put his Jewish identity aside, for instance, when exercising his rights as a citizen in occasions such as voting. He states, "then I am not a Jew, but I feel and act as a citizen of the republic." This perspective, published in his collection Sabbath Hours: Thoughts, demonstrates how Reform Judaism at KAM sought to integrate Jewish religious identity with full American citizenship. This is further supported by his outspoken stance as an American patriot during the civil war, even going as far as to send his eldest son to the Union Army. This approach that Adler held resonates with some of the key characteristics of Reform Judaism and reflected his belief that Jewish identity could evolve while maintaining its essential character.

=== Official adoption of Reform Judaism (1874) ===
With the congregation joining the Union of American Hebrew Congregations in 1874, also known now as the Union for Reform Judaism, the transition of K. A. M. from Orthodox to Reform Judaism was essentially formalized. The congregations admission into this organization aligned it officially with the Reform movement in America in a way that could be clearly perceived in the services as, for instance, it adopted "the Merzbacher prayer-book" in January 1873, and introduced "Friday evening services, with choir and sermon." These changes represented a dramatic shift from the Orthodox practices of the congregation's keeping it parallel with the progress of Reform Judaism elsewhere in the late 19th century.

=== 20th Century influence ===
Tobias Schanfarber served as rabbi of KAM from 1901 to 1926, when he retired and became rabbi emeritus.

KAM Isaiah Israel's significance within the Reform movement is demonstrated by the fact that four of its rabbis were elected president of the Central Conference of American Rabbis, the rabbinic arm of Reform Judaism.

Rabbi Jacob J. Weinstein (1939–1967) served as the Central Conference president from 1965 to 1969, making him one of the most prominent Reform rabbis of his era. During his tenure at KAM, Weinstein became "a leading spokesman for Judaism's mission of social action in American society" and "a fervent opponent of racism." His national leadership platform allowed him to promote progressive social justice positions that would become hallmarks of Reform Judaism.

Rabbi Hayim Goren Perelmuter led Temple Isaiah Israel from the mid-1950s until the 1971 merger, helping to stabilize the congregation and guide it through its historic union with KAM. Beyond his congregational duties, he became "the first Professor of Jewish Studies at Catholic Theological Union," where he "made a deep and lasting impact on Jewish-Christian relations in the Chicago community and beyond."

=== The 1971 merger and continued Reform evolution ===
Two congregations, KAM and Isaiah Israel merged in 1971 to form the current establishment KAM Isaiah Israel. This strengthened the reform identity by bringing together two Reform congregations with complementary strengths whose membership and expertise could support each other, creating a more robust institution committed to Reform Judaism's principles. This merger also brought the congregation to its current location in the historic synagogue building designed in the Byzantine Revival style.

== Social justice and community involvement ==
=== Arnold Jacob Wolf leadership (1980-2000) ===
The pinnacle of the merged KAM Isaiah Israel's commitment to social activism is embodied in the leadership of Rabbi Arnold Jacob Wolf. Wolf's approach to rabbinical leadership integrated deep and passionate faith with social activism and justice. Some of his civil rights activism involved marching in Selma, Alabama, for which he received a Brotherhood Award from the National Council of Christians and Jews in 1962. Moreover, while being rabbi of Congregation several decades earlier, Wolf invited guest speakers over the years, who included the Rev. Dr. Martin Luther King Jr. and the Chicago Seven, the seven defendants charged with inciting to riot and other offenses stemming from protests at the 1968 Democratic National Convention, highlighting his commitment to social activism. Through continued social activism leadership by Arnold Jacob Wolf, KAM Isaiah Israel now self-describes itself as "one of the leading social action congregations in the country."

=== Contemporary community engagement ===
The congregation continues its tradition of social justice through multiple contemporary initiatives. Some of these programs include the Rabbinic Heritage Committee, established in 2017, which honors the memory of social activist rabbis by sponsoring programs in the community that promote "Jewish thought and practice, social justice, Israel, interfaith understanding, the arts, and intergenerational activities." Moreover, KAM Isaiah Israel maintains active partnerships with Chicago-area social justice organizations, including its founding membership in the Jewish Council on Urban Affairs synagogue partnership, which serves as "the Jewish voice for social justice in Chicago." These programs are also strengthened by the congregation's involvement in the Hyde Park Refugee Project, which represents a significant commitment to immigrant rights.

== Notable members ==
- Dankmar Adler, German-born architect and civil engineer
- Leon Despres, author, attorney, and Chicago Alderman
- Solomon Freehof, rabbi from 1924 to 1934
- Arthur Goldberg, politician, 9th U.S. Secretary of Labor, and Associate Justice of the U.S. Supreme Court
- Max Janowski, German-born composer of Jewish liturgical music
- Donald N. Levine, sociologist, social theorist, and professor at the University of Chicago
- Abner Mikva, politician, U.S. Representative, and federal judge
- Martha Nussbaum, philosopher and professor at the University of Chicago
- Sara Paretsky, author of detective fiction
- Arnold Jacob Wolf, rabbi from 1980 to 2000

== See also ==
- History of the Jews in Chicago
- List of Chicago Landmarks
- Pilgrim Baptist Church
- A sample of synagogues built in the Neo-Byzantine style:
  - Hurva Synagogue, Jerusalem, Israel
  - Grand Choral Synagogue, Saint Petersburg, Russia
  - Congregation Beth Israel, West Hartford, Connecticut
