= Franz Mairecker =

Austrian violinist

- Born: 11 April 1879; Gumpoldskirchen, Austro-Hungarian Empire
- Died: 11 May 1950; Vienna, Austria
- Occupation(s): Musician, tutor, lecturer
- Instruments: Violin

Franz Mairecker (11 April 1879 – 11 May 1950) was an Austrian violinist, music teacher and lecturer.

== Life ==
Born in Gumpoldskirchen, Mairecker studied with Josef Maxinczak, Jakob Grün, Ernst Ludwig and Robert Fuchs at the Vienna Conservatory from 1889 to 1895. He then worked as a substitute in the Vienna Court Opera Orchestra.

The violinist became a member of the Vienna Philharmonic in 1898. There he held various positions. Thus he was a member of the orchestra's committee from 1909 to 1938, vice-president of the board from 1911 to 1933, and concertmaster from 1921. He founded the Mairecker Quartet in 1922, with which he travelled throughout Europe and America. In his birthplace of Gumpoldskirchen he owned an old winery.

Mairecker taught violin and chamber music from 1919 at the Academy of Music and Performing Arts, which had emerged from the Vienna Conservatory. There he became lecturer in 1924 and extraordinary professor in 1929. He also served as a member of the examination commission for the teaching profession of music at secondary schools and teacher training colleges from 1922.

Mairecker retired from the Vienna Philharmonic in 1945 and from the academy in 1946. He died in Vienna four years later at the age of 71.

== Honours ==
- Golden Medaille of the University of Buenos Aires (1922)
- Berufstitel, Regierungsrat (1927) and Hofrat (1934)
- Officier de l’instruction publique (1928)
- Knight's Cross I. Classe of the Österreichischen Verdienstordens (1934)
- Naming of the Maireckergasse in Vienna-Rodaun (1957)
