= Benjamin Brafman =

American criminal defense attorney (born 1948)

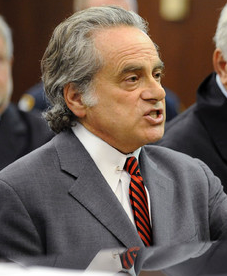
- Brafman in 2017
- Education: Brooklyn College (BA); Ohio Northern University (JD); New York University (LLM)
- Occupation: Attorney
- Spouse: Lynda Brafman
- Children: 2

Benjamin Brafman is an American criminal defense attorney and founder of the Manhattan-based law firm Brafman & Associates. Brafman is known for representing many high-profile defendants, including celebrities, accused Mafia members, and political figures.

== Early life and education ==
Brafman grew up in Brooklyn and Belle Harbor, Queens, a son of Holocaust survivors. Brafman's family fled from Europe to Cuba on their way to the United States just before World War II. He went to a Yeshiva High School and took night classes at Brooklyn College, majoring in anthropology and graduated with a Bachelor of Arts degree.

Brafman received his Juris Doctor with distinction from Ohio Northern University College of Law. He also earned an LL.M. from New York University School of Law. In May 2014, Brafman was awarded an honorary degree by Ohio Northern University College of Law.

== Career ==
After graduating from law school and being admitted to the New York State Bar in 1975, Brafman worked for a criminal defense firm for two years, then became an Assistant District Attorney in the Manhattan District Attorney's Office. In 1980, Brafman started his own law firm in Manhattan.

=== Notable cases ===
Brafman slowly established his reputation as a celebrity lawyer through a series of high-profile cases. Notable clients have included:

- Jacob Arabo, jeweler
- Philip Banks III, New York City Deputy Mayor
- Jay S. Cohen, online gambling figure
- Dinesh D'Souza, political pundit
- Peter Gatien, nightclub owner
- Vincent "Chin" Gigante, American Mafia boss
- Salvatore "Sammy the Bull" Gravano, American Mafia underboss
- Michael Jackson, musician
- Carl Kruger, New York politician
- Charles Kushner, real estate developer
- James Patino, who was cleared of all charges in the death of Yusef Hawkins
- Sanford Rubenstein, high-profile attorney
- Marvell Scott, sportscaster
- Jacob Walden, owner and executive of assisted-living facilities
- Menachem Youlus, rabbi

==== Sean "P. Diddy" Combs ====
Brafman defended Sean "P. Diddy" Combs during his 1999 trial on illegal weapons and bribery charges. Combs, who referred to Brafman as "Uncle Benny" was acquitted of the criminal charges, which stemmed from a nightclub brawl while he was accompanied by then-girlfriend Jennifer Lopez and his usual entourage. One hundred prosecution witnesses and others testified to Combs's culpability, but still a not-guilty verdict was decreed on all charges, raising Brafman's profile.

In November 2023, Brafman would again represent Combs as he was facing a $30 million sexual assault lawsuit from his former girlfriend Cassie Ventura. He would publicly denounce Ventura's accusations against Combs, including in an exclusive interview with People. The lawsuit would end the day after it was filed when both parties agreed to an undisclosed settlement.

==== Plaxico Burress shooting ====
On November 30, 2008, Brafman was hired to represent NFL star Plaxico Burress who, on August 3, 2009, was indicted on two counts of criminal possession of a weapon, and one count of reckless endangerment. Burress pleaded guilty to a weapons charge and was sentenced to two years in prison.

==== Dominique Strauss-Kahn ====
In 2011, Brafman represented French politician, economist and former IMF head Dominique Strauss-Kahn in a sexual assault case involving a member of the housekeeping staff of an upscale New York City hotel. Brafman and Strauss-Kahn's other lawyer, William W. Taylor, III, of Zuckerman Spaeder LLP, gained first a recommendation that charges be dropped from New York County District Attorney Cyrus Vance, and then charges dropped by New York State Supreme Court Justice Michael Obus. Brafman discussed his defense of Strauss-Kahn on Charlie Rose in February, 2012.

==== Martin Wolmark ====
In 2014 and 2015, Brafman represented Martin Wolmark of the Epstein-Wolmark gang, an outfit that had plotted the kidnap and torture of Jewish husbands to coerce them into granting their wives gets (religious divorces). Wolmark pled guilty to the charges, and was sentenced to three years in prison.

==== Martin Shkreli ====
In early 2016, Martin Shkreli retained Brafman to defend him. In a 2017 jury trial, Shkreli was found guilty on two counts of securities fraud and one count of conspiracy to commit securities fraud. He was sentenced to seven years in prison.

==== Harvey Weinstein ====
Former film producer Harvey Weinstein hired Brafman in 2017, after numerous sexual abuse allegations against him from prominent members of Hollywood resulted in charges and a criminal trial. Brafman represented Weinstein at his arraignment on May 25, 2018 in Manhattan Criminal Court on charges of first-degree rape and third-degree rape in one case, and first-degree criminal sex act in another case. Brafman said in an interview: "Mr. Weinstein did not invent the casting couch in Hollywood. Bad behavior is not on trial in this case." In January 2019, Brafman and Weinstein issued a joint statement officially parting ways. Weinstein would subsequently get convicted on several charges, and sentenced to 23 years in prison.

== Personal life ==
Brafman is a practicing Orthodox Jew.

His wife, Lynda, is a librarian. The Brafmans lived in a "cramped Forest Hills apartment" early in their marriage and, by 1998, lived in an "enormous Long Island brick mansion." Brafman has lived in the Five Towns area of Long Island since 1981. The couple have two children, Jennifer and David, and a number of grandchildren.

Brafman's older brother, Aaron, was an Orthodox rabbi in Far Rockaway, Queens.

Brafman is a self-described "short Jewish guy," standing five feet, six inches tall.
