= Beth Tfiloh Congregation =

Modern Orthodox congregation in Pikesville, Maryland

- Location within Maryland

Religion
- Affiliation: Orthodox Judaism
- Ecclesiastical or organisational status: Synagogue
- Leadership: Rabbi Chai Posner; Rabbi Mitchell Wohlberg; Rabbi Dr. Eli Yoggev (Associate); Rabbi Jason Goldstein (Assistant); Rabbi Chaim Wecker
- Status: Active

Location
- Location: 3300 Old Court Road, Pikesville, Maryland 21208
- Country: United States
- Coordinates: 39°23′09″N 76°42′24″W

Architecture
- Type: Synagogue
- Established: 1921 (as a congregation)
- Completed: 1927 (Baltimore); 1966 (Pikesville)
- Capacity: 1,600 worshippers

Website
- btfiloh.org

Beth Tfiloh Congregation is a Modern Orthodox congregation and synagogue located at 3300 Old Court Road, in Pikesville, Maryland, in the United States. With approximately 3,500 members, and seating for 1,600 worshippers, Beth Tfiloh claims it is the largest Modern Orthodox congregation in the United States.

== History ==
Logo of Beth Tfiloh Congregation

Beth Tfiloh Congregation was founded in Forest Park in 1921 with Rabbi Samuel Rosenblatt, son of Cantor Yossele Rosenblatt, who served in that capacity until 1972 when he was named Rabbi Emeritus. From 1972 to 1977, David Novak served as Chief Rabbi. He was succeeded by Mitchell Wohlberg, who served as Chief Rabbi of Beth Tfiloh Congregation from 1978 to 2021. In 2022, Rabbi Chai Posner succeeded Rabbi Wohlberg as senior Rabbi of the community. Rabbi Dr. Eli Yoggev serves as associate Rabbi, and Rabbi Chaim Wecker serves as ritual director.

Beth Tfiloh operates the Beth Tfiloh Dahan Community School in Pikesville for children from preschool to twelfth grade. The Congregation also operates the Beth Tfiloh Camp in Owings Mills on property acquired in 1951 as a camp for youth groups.

=== Beth El Congregation ===
In 1948, a group of nine lay leaders of Beth Tfiloh Congregation advocated for holding mixed-gender religious services and expanded b'nei mitzvah ceremonies. Their advocacy was unsuccessful, and instead they formed Beth El Congregation.

=== Beth Jacob Congregation ===
On March 8, 2007, Beth Tfiloh announced that it would merge with Beth Jacob Congregation, a 69-year-old congregation run at the time by Rabbi Gavriel Newman. Beth Jacob Congregation's membership had decreased over the years, and it was at about 500 in 2007, most of whom were age 75 or older. In a vote whether to go forward with the merger, 87 percent of Beth Jacob Congregation's members voted in favor. The merger happened in August 2007. Rabbi Newman decided to start a new congregation called Kehal Yaakov.

=== Winands Road Synagogue ===
Winands Road Synagogue Center was chartered in 1985, and was the last-remaining synagogue in the once-thriving neighborhood of Randallstown. In 2016, the synagogue announced its decision to close its doors. In March 2018, a formal merger was announced between the two shuls, with Winands Road Synagogue members invited to formally join the Beth Tfiloh community and welcomed in a special Shabbat service in April 2018. The Winands Road building was later sold.

== Notable members ==
- Benjamin Cardin, a U.S. senator from Maryland

== See also ==
- History of the Jews in Maryland
