= Kol Ami =

Kol Ami ('voice of my people') is the name of several synagogues in the United States:

- Kol Ami (Tucson, Arizona)
- Congregation Kol Ami of Frederick in Maryland
- Congregation Kol Ami (Cherry Hill, New Jersey)
- Temple Kol Ami (Fort Mill, South Carolina)
- Congregation Kol Ami (Salt Lake City, Utah)

== See also ==
- Kolami, a language
