= History of the Jews in Cumberland, Maryland =

The city of Cumberland, Maryland is home to a small and declining but historically significant Jewish community. The city is home to a single synagogue, B'er Chayim Temple, one of the oldest synagogues in the United States. Cumberland has had a Jewish presence since the early 1800s. The community was largest prior to the 1960s, but has declined in number over the decades. Historically, the Jewish community in Cumberland maintained several synagogues, a Jewish cemetery, and a Hebrew school. By 2019, Cumberland's Jewish community had its lowest population point since the early 1900s.

== Demographics ==
By 1853, 12 Jewish families resided in the city of Cumberland, which at the time had a total population of 6,150.

According to a 1927 report issued by the American Jewish Committee, the Jewish population of Cumberland in that year was 720.

== History ==
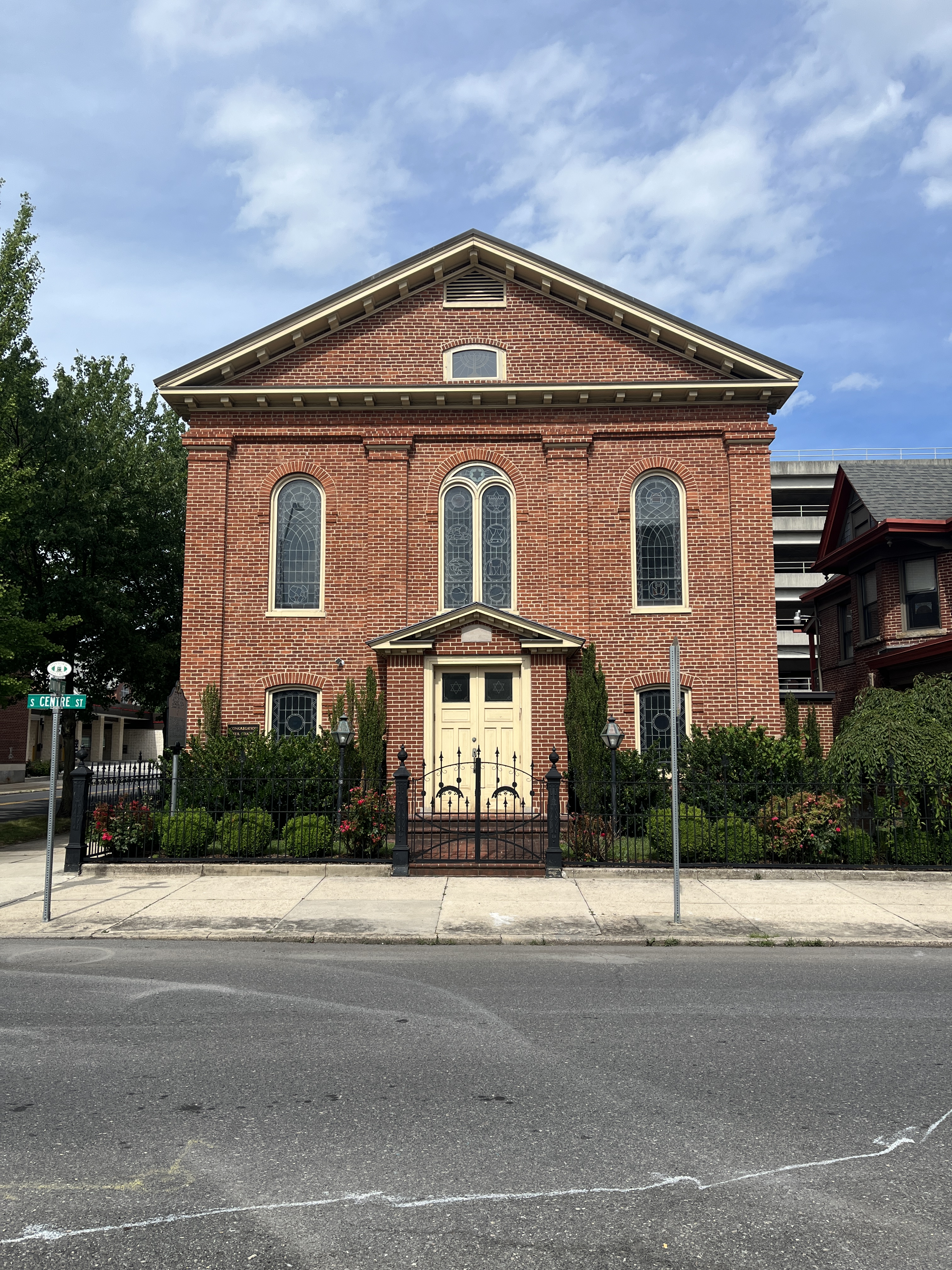
B'er Chayim Temple, 2026.

The first documented mention of a Jewish resident of Cumberland dates to 1816, when "one Hebrew" was listed as a donor when the Episcopalian and Presbyterian congregations asked for donations to build a church. By 1853, enough Jews resided in Cumberland to form the city's first synagogue, B'er Chayim Temple (BCT). The synagogue in on the National Register of Historic Places and is the oldest continuously used synagogue in Maryland, the oldest in Appalachia, and the sixth oldest in the United States. While originally founded as an Orthodox synagogue, the synagogue has been a hub German Reform Judaism. As the synagogue was founded by German Jews, prayers and sermons were originally held in German, rather than Hebrew.

One of the first acts of B'er Chayim was the establishment of a Jewish cemetery, the Eastview Cemetery. Eastview Cemetery was established off the Maryland Turnpike at the cost of $84 on March 13, 1854. On 10 August of that year, there was a cholera epidemic in Cumberland, and the first burial occurred at Eastview. In 1973, at the cost of $100, an additional parcel of land was purchased to enlarge the cemetery.

The Grumbach Mohel Book (a manuscript of Nota Grumbach, a Bavarian Jewish ritual circumcisor in Baltimore after 1852) lists circumcisions in Cumberland during the early 1860s.

In 1913, Beth Jacob Hebrew Congregation was founded as the second synagogue in Cumberland. While originally Orthodox, the synagogue became Conservative in 1949. Romney, West Virginia, mayor and businessman David Shear was a member of the Beth Jacob Hebrew Congregation and served as its vice president.

Even at the community's height of population in the 1950s, it was still small compared to Jewish communities in urban areas and conveniences that were easy to come by to larger Jewish communities were difficult to acquire for Cumberland's Jews. Lox had to be imported in bulk from Baltimore, to be sold by the Jewish owner of a liquor store in downtown Cumberland. Prior to improvements in automotive transportation (construction on Interstate 68 did not begin until 1965), travel between Cumberland to Baltimore once required an all-day trip. According to one Jewish resident, motorists had to "put in fuel and water at the top of each mountain." Because maintaining traditional Jewish observance was arduous for Jews in Western Maryland, many Jews decided to assimilate into the larger Cumberland community. Others decided to persist in maintaining ways to keep observant Jewish homes, observe Shabbat and the Chagim, and practice Jewish customs and rituals. Due to the long distance from larger Jewish communities, maintaining outside contact was crucial, sometimes outsiders brought food and supplies to Cumberland, while others times travel to nearby urban Jewish communities was necessary.

In 2005, a federal court ruled that Western Correctional Institution in Cumberland could deny kosher food, Jewish worship, and Judaic objects to prison inmates. In 2006, Maryland Governor Robert Ehrlich approved kosher food for Maryland inmates. By October 2006, with the assistance of Rabbi Menachem Katz, the prisoner was allowed to blow the shofar for Rosh Hashanah, but not for Yom Kippur.

Beth Jacob Synagogue merged into B'er Chayin Temple in 1998.

In 2018, Jan Marx Braverman, a member of Lake Chapala Jewish Congregation (LCJC) in Ajijic, Mexico, reached out to B'er Chayim Temple to ask if the congregation would donate a Sefer Torah. Before retiring and moving to Mexico, Braverman belonged to Beth Jacob Congregation, which merged into B'er Chayim in the 1990s. In December 2018, B'er Chayim approved a loan of the Torah to LCJC. A delegation which included the rabbi and several lay people travelled to Ajijic in 2019 to deliver the Torah.

== Notable people ==
- John Hays, Mayor of Cumberland (1852-53)

== See also ==
- History of the Jews in Baltimore
- History of the Jews in Frederick, Maryland
- History of the Jews in Pittsburgh
- History of the Jews in Washington, D.C.
