= History of the Jews in Washington, D.C. =

The history of the Jews in Washington, D.C. dates back to the late 18th century and continues today. From only individual Jews settling in the city to the waves of Jewish migration in the 1840s, during the American Civil War, and in the late 19th century to the early 20th century and beyond, the community has steadily grown.

As it has gained in numbers, it has also built up numerous communal institutions, including some of the oldest remaining synagogues in the United States, and has a legacy of pulling together in times of war and crisis for both the nation and the Jewish world at large. Today, the Greater Washington community is the third largest in the United States, and remains active and influential in American politics and the broader Jewish world.

== Early history ==
The first known Jewish resident of Washington D.C. is Isaac Polock, who arrived in 1795 and completed the building of the brick mansions known as the Six Buildings, located at 21st Street and Pennsylvania Avenue, west of the White House. The buildings once housed the United States Department of State and Secretary of the Navy, and later served as the homes of Secretaries of State James Madison and William H. Seward, as well as General Sam Houston.

Major Alfred Mordecai, raised in an Orthodox household in North Carolina, was a West Point graduate who settled in D.C. in 1828 after being assigned to the Washington Arsenal. His daughter, Rosa, was born in 1839 and is the first known Jew to be born in the District.

More Jewish families began to settle in the District in the 1840s, largely German Jewish immigrants, many of whom had connections to the Baltimore Jewish community. In 1852, the Washington Hebrew Congregation was established by 21 newly arrived Jews. While serving as president of the congregation, Captain Jonas Phillips Levy helped to lobby Congress to enshrine the congregation's right to own property in the District into law, resulting in the passage of "An Act for the Benefit of the Hebrew Congregation in the City of Washington" which was signed by President Franklin Pierce in 1856. It remains the only congregation with its own Congressional charter. The congregation was also responsible for opening the first Jewish school in the District.

When the Civil War broke out, Washington D.C. was a heart of the conflict as the Union capital, sandwiched by two slave states, and right across the river from Confederate Alexandria, Virginia. The war transformed the city, and its entire population skyrocketed, including the Jewish population which grew times ten during the war, from 200 to 2,000. Six new kosher restaurants were opened, some of the 450 restaurants operating in the city during the war. The Washington Hebrew Congregation cared for injured Jewish soldiers during the war, and buried the bodies of unclaimed Jews. A corp of women in the congregation also helped to raise funds for the U.S. Sanitary commission. In 1864, B'nai B'rith opened a lodge with 28 members upon opening.

In 1869, upset by liturgical changes and the installation of an organ-like instrument, a group of members left Washington Hebrew to found their own congregation, Adas Israel. When the synagogue's construction was completed in 1876, President Ulysses S. Grant attended its dedication.

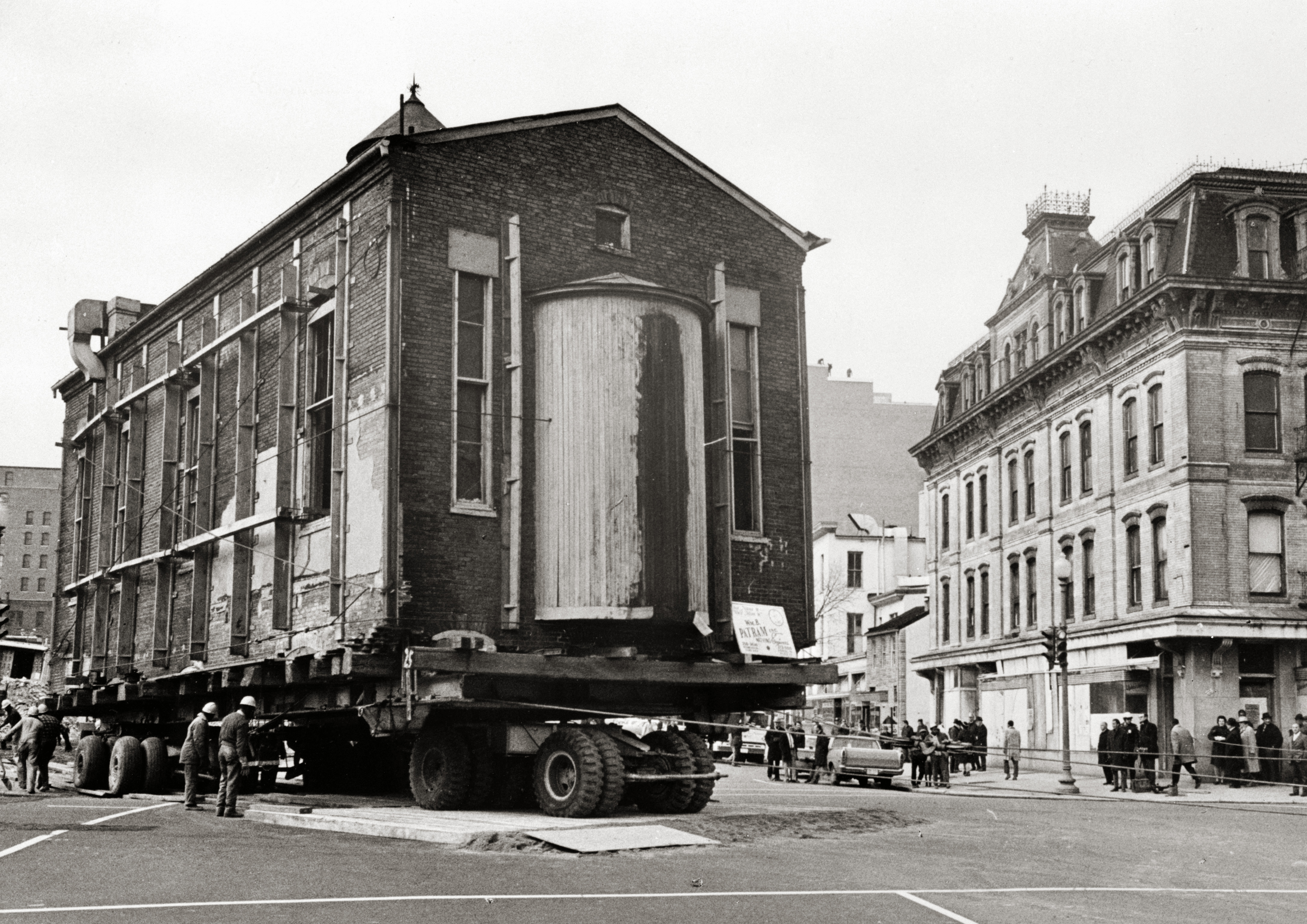
Adas Israel Synagogue as it was being moved from its original location in 1969

Many of those who arrived in D.C. during wartime had decided to stay, and by 1880, the Jewish population was roughly 1,500. Seventh Street Northwest, an important business district, had a particularly high concentration of Jewish residents. There were also significant Jewish populations in the Southwest and Georgetown areas, and they began establishing their own organizations and congregations.

The wave of Jewish migration from diaspora communities in Eastern Europe in the late 19th century and early 20th century brought the District's Jewish population to 4,000. Overall, the new immigrants, a large portion of whom came from Russia, were poor. The D.C. Jewish community set up multiple charity organizations in response, including a Hebrew Free Loan Society, the Hebrew Relief Society, and a Jewish Foster Home. Other community organizations founded around this time included the Hebrew Home for the Aged, the D.C chapter of the National Council of Jewish Women, and a Young Men's Hebrew Association (YMHA) and Young Women's Hebrew Association (YWHA). Minnie Lansburgh Goldsmith, daughter of the Lansburgh's co-founder Gustav Lansburgh, was at the heart of charitable giving and community organizing in this time and throughout her life.

== 20th century ==
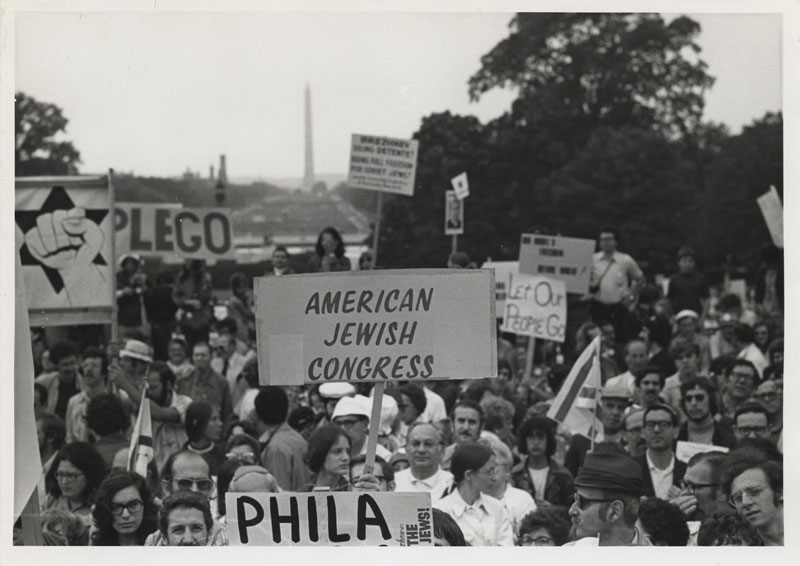
Protest on the National Mall in support of Soviet Jews in 1973.

When World War I brought a wave of servicemen and government workers to the District, the Jewish community organized programs like dances and social events, often run by the YMHA and YWHA. These activities were part of the impetus for the creation of the Jewish Community Center in 1926, situated a mile from the White House on 16th Street. In 1930, the National Jewish Ledger, which later changed its name to Washington Jewish Week, began publishing. In 1938 the Jewish Community Council was formed, creating a centralized organization tasked with advocating for all the Jewish communal organizations in the District.

Zionist organizations also set up chapters in the city, such as the Washington Zionist Organization, a chapter of the Zionist Organization of America, and the Washington Poale Zion Society. Following a visit to D.C. by its founder, Henrietta Szold, a chapter of Hadassah was established in 1919.

During the period of the Great Depression, the Jewish community once again rapidly expanded, more than doubling in size. Jews from all over the country came to the District to work on New Deal projects, or in the growing civil service. The Hebrew Sheltering Society, and numerous social service organizations, helped to provide kosher food, distribute clothing, and obtain housing for new arrivals D.C. still looking for work. Also in this time, the Jewish community began to spread out to suburbs in Maryland and neighborhoods in the north of D.C. Moving north, however, was somewhat restricted by the presence of covenants in some real estate deeds that prohibited leasing or selling the property to Jews, African Americans, and other groups in places like Spring Valley and portions of Chevy Chase, Maryland. Such covenants were later ruled unenforceable by law by the U.S. Supreme Court in 1948 in Shelley v. Kraemer.

In the 1930s, as it became increasingly dangerous for the Jews in Europe, the Washington Jewish community was especially active in trying to aid rescue efforts. The community signed petitions and demonstrated to try and pressure the British government to allow Jews to immigrate to Mandatory Palestine, including filling DAR Constitution Hall with 4,000 protesters in 1938. The first Jewish U.S. Supreme Court Justice, Louis Brandeis, hosted a salon with local and national Zionist leaders at his apartment and was active in the Zionist movement.

During World War II, the community assisted Jewish newcomers arriving to work for the government or serve in the military. In 1941, JCC was responsible for finding housing for 4,000 Jews who moved to the area. The community's organizations also stepped up to provide social, cultural, and religious programs for members of the armed forces. In 1944 the Hebrew Academy opened, the first Jewish day school in the area.

After the war, many prominent members of the area's Jewish community helped to secretly raise funds for illegal immigration to Mandatory Palestine, as well as the Haganah. After the establishment of the State of Israel in 1948, local Jews purchased the first embassy for the newly formed state near Embassy Row.

The Jewish population of the area went from 20,000 in 1945 to 81,000 in 1956, half of whom were living in the suburbs and not the District itself. The population reached 110,000 in 1970. With the expanse into the suburbs also came new synagogues, and Jewish organizations that had been in the city also moved to more suburban areas including the JCC, the Jewish Social Services Agency, the Hebrew Home for the Aged, and eventually the United Jewish Appeal (UJA) and the Jewish Community Council relocated to a centralized campus in Rockville.

In the 1950s and 1960s, many members of the Jewish community was active in the Civil Rights Movement, and the Jewish Community Council, now known as the Jewish Community Relations Council, made its support formally known in the Thompson's restaurant case in 1953. After the Brown v. Board of Education decision, the council also worked with city and religious leaders to promote a peaceful transition to integration. In 1966, progressive young Jewish intellectuals founded Jews for Urban Justice (JUJ), a left-wing organization founded to oppose anti-Black racism within the Jewish community of Washington, D.C. JUJ campaigned against anti-Black discrimination from Jewish institutions, fought for equal access to housing at a time when prominent white Jewish land developers in the Washington metropolitan area used racially restrictive covenants designed to exclude African-Americans from home ownership, and organized the first Freedom Seder to encourage solidarity between African-Americans and Jewish Americans.

In the 1970s and 1980s, many in the community dedicated themselves to the plight of Jews in the Soviet Union who were forced to suppress their Jewishness, as well as for refuseniks, who were denied permission to leave and emigrate to Israel. They participated in large scale marches on the National Mall, and maintained a daily vigil outside of the Soviet Embassy, with the help of church groups that took over on Shabbat and Jewish holidays.

When the Jewish population in the District began to grow again, the original JCC building near the White House was repurchased, restored, and then reopened during the 1990s. In 1997 there were 165,000 Jews living in Greater Washington. There has also been an effort to preserve D.C.’s Jewish history, including its early downtown synagogues, and the Jewish Historical Society of Greater Washington opened and maintains the Lillian & Albert Small Jewish Museum.

== Today ==
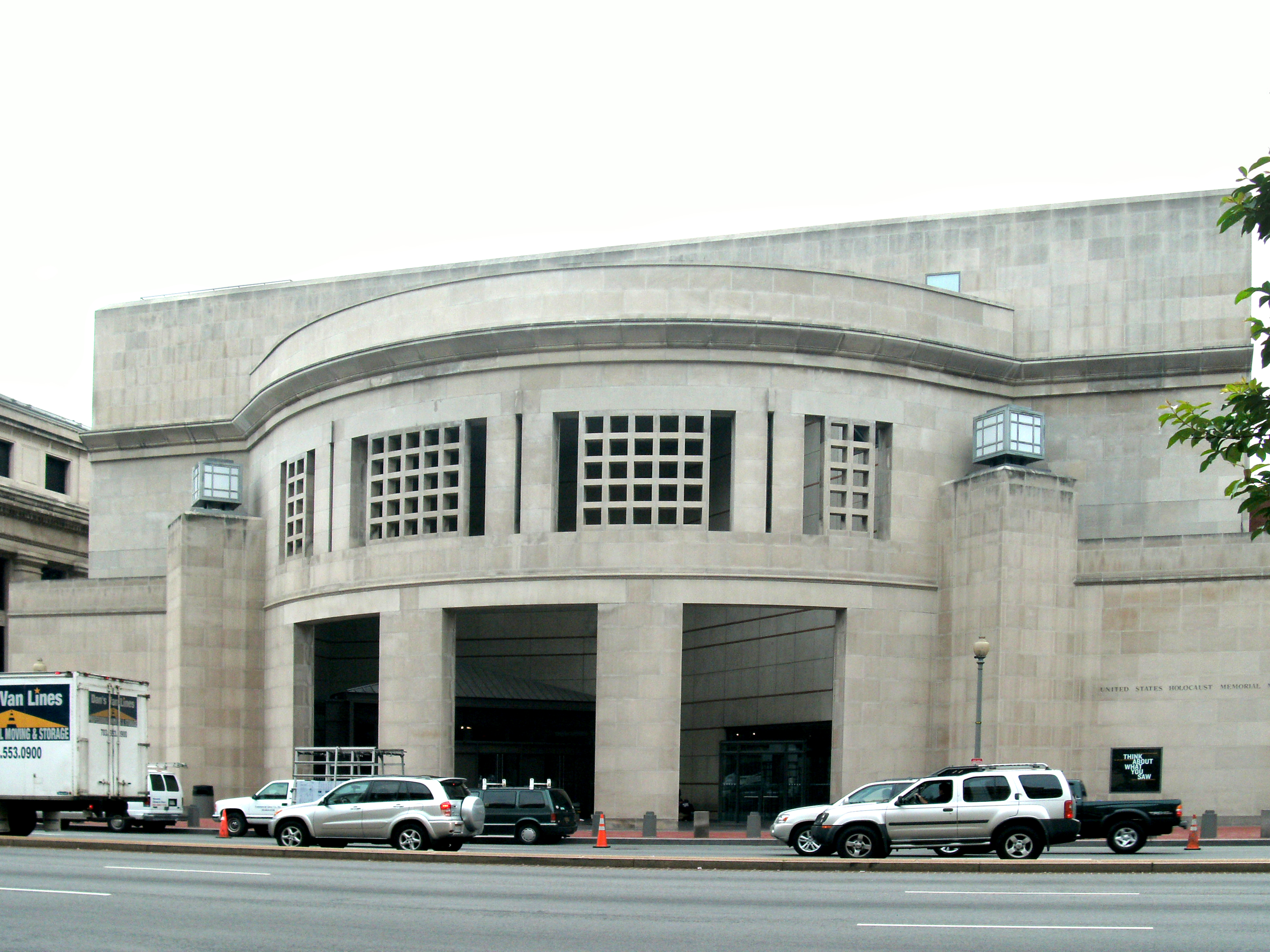
U.S. Holocaust Memorial Museum

Washington, D.C. is also the location of the United States Holocaust Memorial Museum, the official institution for the documentation, study, and interpretation of Holocaust history, as well as serving as the nation's memorial. It was chartered unanimously by Congress following the recommendation of the president's commission on the Holocaust under President Jimmy Carter and opened adjacent to the National Mall in 1993. The National Museum of American Jewish Military History, founded in 1958, was also charted by an act of Congress and documents the contributions of American Jewish servicemembers. Admission to both museums is free.

Today, the community is considered to be the third largest Jewish community by metropolitan area in the United States. As of 2018, it was estimated that 300,000 Jews live in the Washington metropolitan area, of which 57,000 live in the district itself. This is a significant increase from 2003, when the population was 215,000.

While there is no kosher supermarket in Washington D.C., many local grocery stores carry a wide variety of kosher staples. Local kosher restaurants certified by the Vaad HaRabanim (Rabbinical Council of Greater Washington) include Char-Bar, Soupergirl, Max's Kosher Cafe at Nationals Park, Oh Mama Grill DC, and the Brooklyn Sandwich Co. Kosher Food Truck. DC Kosher, a project of the Ohev Sholom synagogue (an Open Orthodox congregation), certifies a number of products and restaurants as kosher, including Baked By Yael, Bubbie's Burgers, Evolve Vegan (also known as ELife Restaurant), PLNT Burger, Pow Wow, Rose and Robert L. Cohen Coffee Bar, Shouk, Sticky Fingers Sweets and Eats, and Whisked!

In 2017, 7% of Jewish adults in the Metro DC Jewish community identified as LGBT and 7% identified as Jews of color or Hispanic/Latino Jews (12,200 people). 9% of Jewish households in the region include a person of color, whether Jewish or non-Jewish. The majority of the DC region's Jews of color, three out of ten, live within Washington, D.C.

== See also ==
- History of the Jews in Baltimore
- History of the Jews in Frederick, Maryland
- History of the Jews in Maryland
- Islam in Washington, D.C.
