= Gladstein =

Gladstein is a surname. Notable people with the surname include:

- Mimi Reisel Gladstein (born 1936), American academic
- Richard N. Gladstein (born 1961), American film producer

== See also ==
- Gladstein Fellowship, a program operated by the Jewish Theological Seminary
- Gladstein Fieldhouse, complex on the campus of Indiana University in Bloomington, Indiana
