= History of the Jews in Frederick, Maryland =

The city of Frederick, Maryland is home to a small but growing Jewish community. With roots dating to the colonial era, Frederick's Jewish community is home to three synagogues, a Hebrew school, and a Jewish community center.

== Demographics ==
According to a 1927 report issued by the American Jewish Committee, the Jewish population of Frederick in that year was 102.

In 2018, around 400 to 500 Jewish families lived in Frederick. Jews constitute less than 1% of the total population of Frederick County.

== History ==
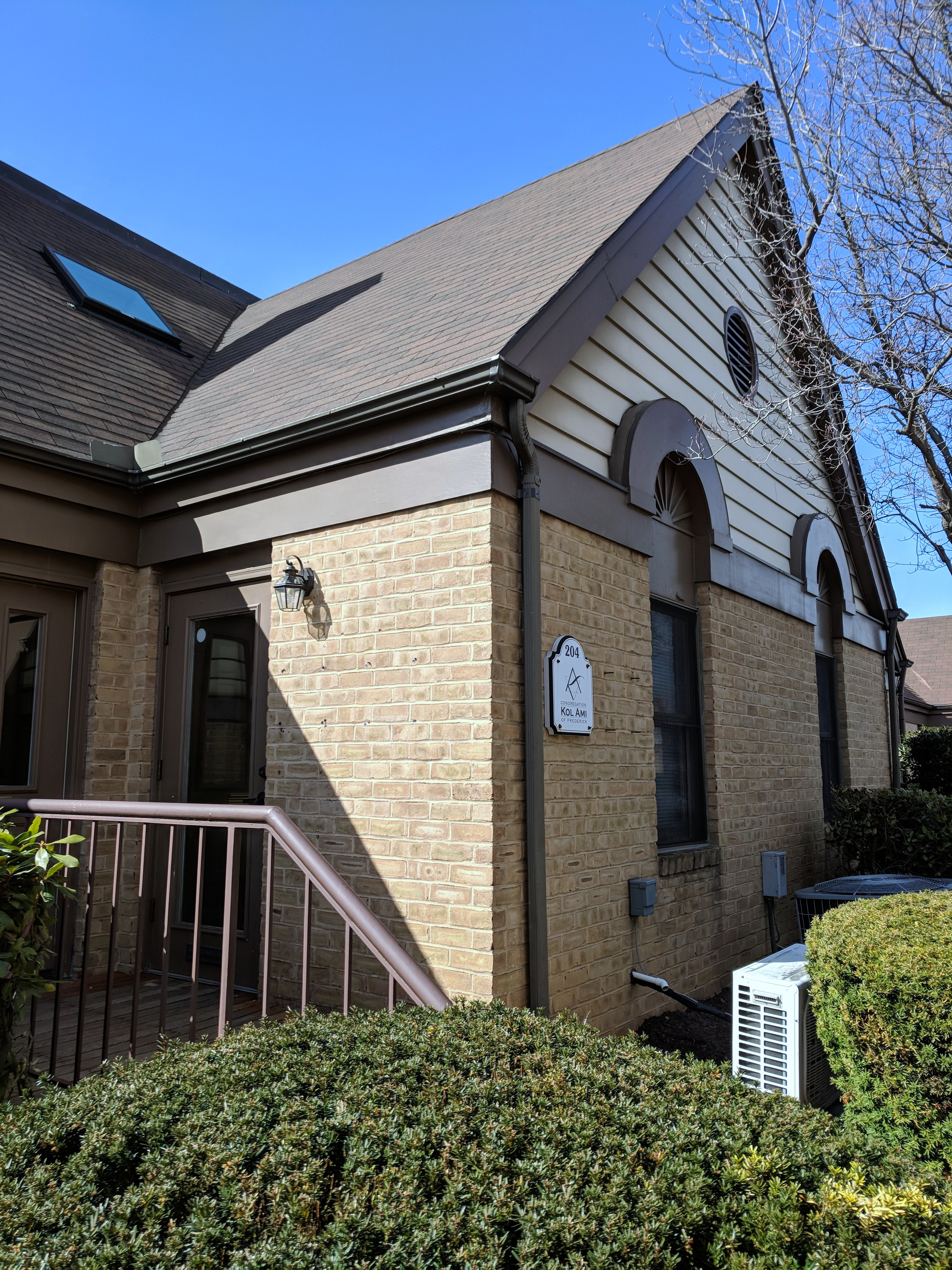
Kol Ami of Frederick, March 2018.

The roots of the Jewish community in Frederick date back to the 1740s. During the 1800s, prominent members of the Frederick Jewish community included the local businessmen David Lowenstein and Benjamin Rosenour and the lawyer Leo Weinberg. These prominent community members were active in founding Frederick's first synagogue.

The first synagogue, the Frederick Hebrew Congregation, was founded in 1840. In 1858, the Frederick Hebrew Congregation received their first rabbi. In 1917, the Frederick Hebrew Congregation was renamed the Beth Sholom Congregation. Beth Sholom is affiliated with Conservative Judaism. In 2003, 312 Jewish families were members of Beth Sholom. About half of Beth Sholom's couples were involved in interfaith marriages, a similar rate to the national average. Services at Beth Sholom are held in both English and Hebrew. There is no mechitza, but women do not actively participate in services, which some Reform members of Beth Sholom have objected to.

Frederick County has historically been a rural and mostly conservative Christian region. After Interstate 270 was built, Frederick was transformed into a suburban bedroom community of Washington, D.C. Many Jews from Washington, D.C., and the D.C. suburbs of Montgomery County have moved to Frederick in recent decades. This influx has caused the community to grow in numbers and allowed for more Jewish institutions to be established.

Until the mid-1990s, Frederick County was a home to an active branch of the Ku Klux Klan. Until the early 2000s, Jewish students were not given days off for the Jewish holidays. The first day of Rosh Hashanah and Yom Kippur are now school holidays in Frederick County.

For 163 years, between 1840 and 2003, Beth Sholom was the only synagogue in Frederick. In 2003, a Reform offshoot of Beth Sholom was founded called Kol Ami of Frederick.

Between 1990 and 1994, Frederick had a Jewish mayor named Paul Gordon.

In 2009, the Chabad Jewish Center was founded. Chabad is the only Orthodox presence in Frederick.

In 2017, Chabad of Frederick purchased a new building on West Ninth Street. The building serves as a space for services, classes, and events. Rabbi Boruch Labkowski is the founder and leader of Chabad in Frederick. Previously, Chabad of Frederick had rented a variety of venues to conduct events, such as the annuel "Purim in Paris" celebration at the Walkersville Volunteer Rescue Co. Hall. Despite representing a different Jewish denomination, Rabbi Jordan Hersh of Beth Sholom supported the new Chabad building as a success for the whole Jewish community.

As of 2018, there is no kosher market, kosher restaurant, or Jewish school in Frederick. Nonetheless, many Jews in Frederick are active and engaged in the Jewish community. The closest kosher markets are 40 miles away in Montgomery County and Baltimore County.

During the 2023-2024 Gaza war, synagogues in Frederick received additional police presence. Rabbi Jennifer Weiner of Kol Ami noted that while she had not noticed antisemitic incidents in Frederick, there had been a national increase in antisemitic incidents that caused concern.

== List of synagogues ==
- Beth Sholom Congregation (Frederick, Maryland)
- Chabad Lubavitch of Frederick
- Kol Ami of Frederick

== Notable people ==
- Morton Mower, a cardiologist and the co-inventor of the automatic implantable cardioverter defibrillator.

== See also ==
- Camp Airy
- History of the Jews in Baltimore
- History of the Jews in Cumberland, Maryland
- History of the Jews in Pittsburgh
- History of the Jews in Washington, D.C.
