= Beth El Congregation (Pikesville, Maryland) =

Synagogue located in Pikesville, Maryland, US

- Location in Maryland

Religion
- Affiliation: Conservative Judaism
- Ecclesiastical or organizational status: Synagogue
- Leadership: Rabbi Steven Schwartz; Rabbi Dana Saroken; Cantor Thom King; Cantor Melanie Blatt Schuster
- Status: Active

Location
- Location: 8101 Park Heights Avenue, Pikesville, Baltimore, Maryland 21208
- Country: United States
- Interactive map of Beth El Congregation
- Coordinates: 39°23′30″N 76°43′22″W

Architecture
- Architect: Sigmund Braverman
- Type: Synagogue architecture
- General contractor: Cogswell Construction Company
- Established: 1948 (as a congregation)
- Groundbreaking: June 7, 1959
- Completed: c. 1948 (Hilton Road); 1960 (Pikesville)

Specifications
- Capacity: 1,500 worshipers
- Interior area: 91,000 square feet (8,500 m^{2})
- Site area: 23 acres (9.3 ha)

Website
- bethelbalto.com

Beth El Congregation is a Conservative Jewish congregation and synagogue, located at 8101 Park Heights Avenue, in Pikesville, an outer suburb of greater Baltimore, Maryland, in the United States. The congregation was established in 1948.

== History ==
In 1948, a group of nine lay leaders of the Orthodox Beth Tfiloh Congregation advocated for holding mixed-gender religious services and expanded b'nai mitvah ceremonies. Their advocacy was unsuccessful, and instead they formed Beth El Congregation. Established as the first Conservative congregation in Maryland, an inaugural dinner was held at Baltimore's Sheraton-Belvedere Hotel on May 10, 1948 to celebrate the occasion.

Located on 3 acres (12,000 m^{2}) at the corner of Hilton Road and Dorithan Road in the Ashburton neighborhood of Baltimore, Beth El's original synagogue included a 1,500-seat chapel, an auditorium, social rooms, a gymnasium, a kitchen, and preschool classrooms. The synagogue was designed by architect Erich Mendelsohn and built by Cogswell Construction Company.

=== New synagogue ===
When Beth El's membership increased from 97 families to 1,100 families between 1950 and 1955, Beth El needed a larger place of worship. Groundbreaking on the new synagogue in Pikesville began on June 7, 1959. Rabbi Jacob B. Agus and Cantor Saul Z. Hammerman were present.

Built on 23 acres (93,000 m^{2}) of land with a construction budget of $1,500,000, the synagogue was designed by architect Sigmund Braverman and built by Cogswell Construction Company. The masonry work was done by McCullough Brothers.

The main synagogue was designed with a 1,500-seat sanctuary, religious school classrooms for 600 students, an assembly hall for 350 people, a social hall designed for 1,000 people, and dining facilities with a capacity of 600 people. The main entrance was surrounded by two large granite pillars, representing pillars built by King Solomon at the First Holy Temple. The main entrance was built with three brass and ceramic plaques that use the Hebrew letters for the word truth, symbolizing creation, revelation, and redemption. The sanctuary was built with ten stained glass windows symbolizing the Jewish festivals. The sanctuary's 24 narrow windows symbolize the 24 books of the Tanakh. The synagogue was dedicated in 1960. In 1961, the Building Congress and Exchange gave an award for craftsmanship for the design and construction of the synagogue.

== Current religious programs, activities and leadership ==
Logo of Beth El Congregation

Beth El hosts twice daily religious services, Shabbat services, and Jewish holiday services. The congregation holds brit milah and baby naming ceremonies for newborns, b'nai mitzvah ceremonies for students, and aufruf ceremonies for engaged couples. A preschool and an after-school program with a religious curriculum are operated by the congregation; a youth group for teenagers has been running since 1964; and classes and religious study groups for adults have been conducted since 1949.

The congregation is led by Rabbi Steven Schwartz and Rabbi Dana Saroken. The cantors are Thom King and Melanie Blatt.

== See also ==
- History of the Jews in Maryland
