= Ruach Minyan =

Coordinates: 38°56′13″N 77°3′28″W

- Type: Independent minyan
- Purpose: Shabbat evening services and dinner
- Location(s): 2850 Quebec Street, NW; Washington, DC 20008
- Region served: Washington, DC, metro area

Ruach Minyan is an independent minyan or chavurah in Washington, D.C., organized entirely by volunteer leadership and affiliated with Adas Israel Congregation. Its primary activity is Friday night services and dinner.

== Description ==
Ruach Minyan is an egalitarian Kabbalat Shabbat and Ma'ariv service that combines traditional, songful davening with Shabbat dinner.
