= B'er Chayim Temple =

Historic synagogue in Cumberland, Maryland, United States

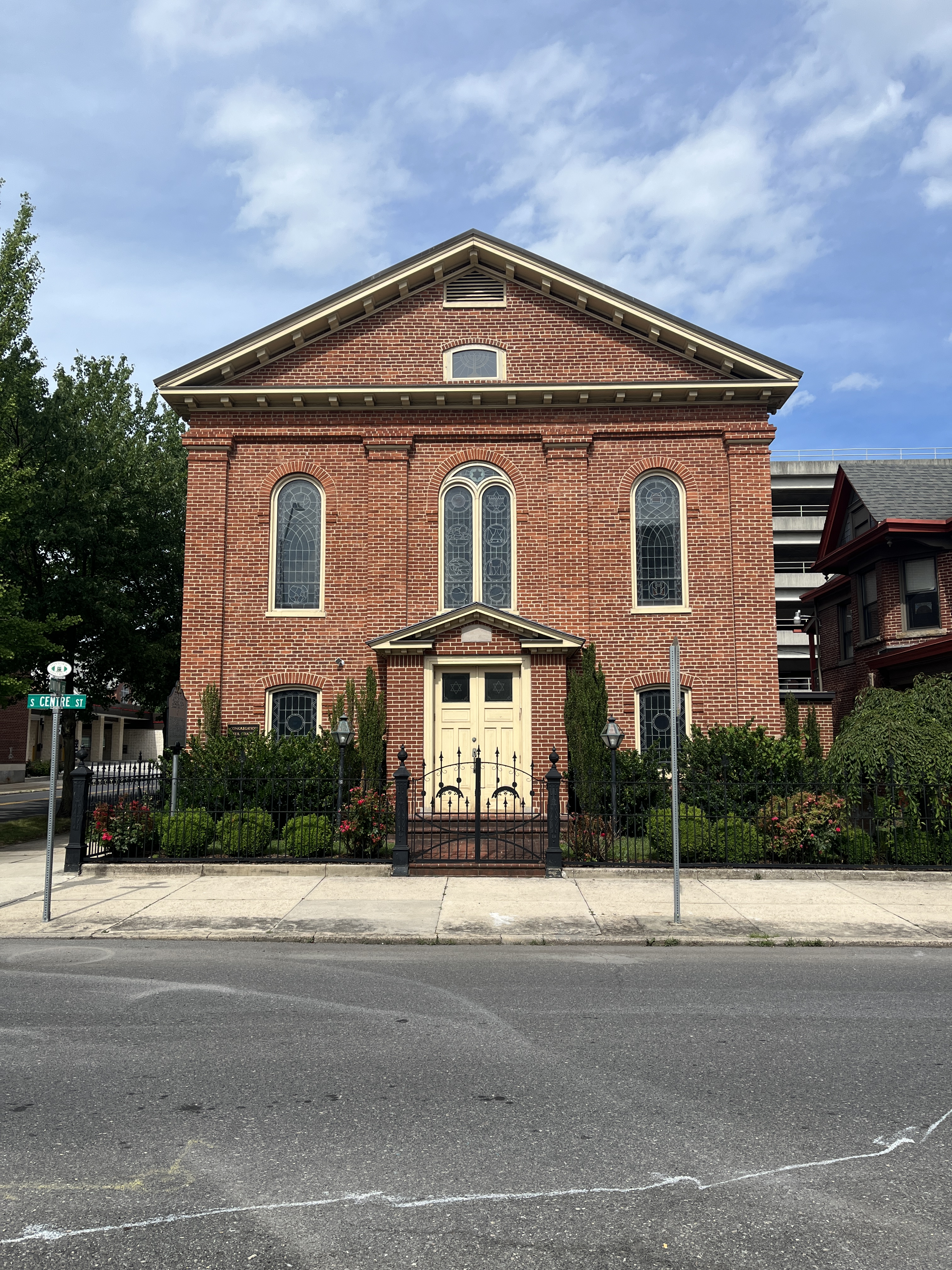
- The synagogue, in 2026

- Location in Maryland

Religion
- Affiliation: Reform Judaism
- Ecclesiastical or organizational status: Synagogue
- Leadership: Cantor Jessica Roskin
- Status: Active

Location
- Location: 107 W Union at South Centre Streets, Cumberland, Maryland
- Country: United States
- Interactive map of B'er Chayim Temple
- Coordinates: 39°39′2″N 78°45′38″W

Architecture
- Type: Synagogue architecture
- Style: Greek Revival
- General contractor: John B. Walton
- Established: 1853 (as a congregation)
- Completed: 1864 (162 years ago)

Website
- berchayim.org
- B'er Chayim Temple
- U.S. National Register of Historic Places
- Area: Less than one acre
- NRHP reference No.: 79001106
- Added to NRHP: November 15, 1979 (46 years ago)

B'er Chayim Temple (transliterated from Hebrew as "Well of Life", a metaphor in which Torah is likened to water) is a Reform Jewish congregation and synagogue, located in Cumberland, Maryland, in the United States. As of 2008, B'er Chayim counted approximately 50 families as members.

B'er Chayim is the oldest synagogue building in continuous use as a synagogue in Maryland and the sixth oldest in the United States.

== Clergy and leadership ==
Jessica Roskin is the spiritual leader of B’er Chayim since July 2024.A native of North Miami Beach, FL, Cantor Roskin graduated from Indiana University with degrees in music and religious studies and Hebrew Union College-Jewish Institute of Religion. She was ordained in 1994. Prior to joining B’er Chayim, Cantor Roskin served as interim cantor at Temple Beth El in Charlotte, NC and at Temple Emanu-El in Birmingham, AL for 20 years.

Brian Lang serves as President of B'er Chayim.

== Religious services and programs ==
Shabbat services are held Friday evening. Services and celebrations of Jewish holidays, such as Rosh Hashanah, Yom Kippur, and Chanukah, are held throughout the year.

== History ==
The first Jewish resident recorded in Cumberland dates to 1816. Twelve Jewish families were living in Cumberland, which then had a population of 6,150, in 1853 when congregation B'er Chayim was chartered by the Maryland state legislature. The congregation was Orthodox when the temple was built, although it is now a Reform congregation.

Between 1865 and 1867, the congregation built a two-story, Greek Revival synagogue building on the corner of South Centre and Union Streets. The building cost $7,427.02 to construct. The facade is ornamented with four pilasters, a handsome pediment, and four very un-Greek Rundbogenstil, or round-arched, windows. The building was constructed by local builder John B. Walton.

Prayers and sermons were originally held in German, rather than Hebrew.

Beth Jacob Synagogue, which was also located in Cumberland, merged with B'er Chayim Temple in 1996.

In 2011, the synagogue underwent renovation. The brickwork's mortar was redone, the wrought iron gates outside the entrance were restored, improved the interior, and made the synagogue wheelchair-accessible. The synagogue's building was reopened on August 17, 2014, and the synagogue was rededicated on November 7, 2014. The Cumberland Historic Preservation Board gave an award to B'er Chayim for the synagogue's restoration.

== See also ==
- 1866 in architecture
- List of oldest synagogues in the United States
- History of the Jews in Maryland
