= Washington Hebrew Congregation =

Reform Jewish synagogue in Washington, D.C.

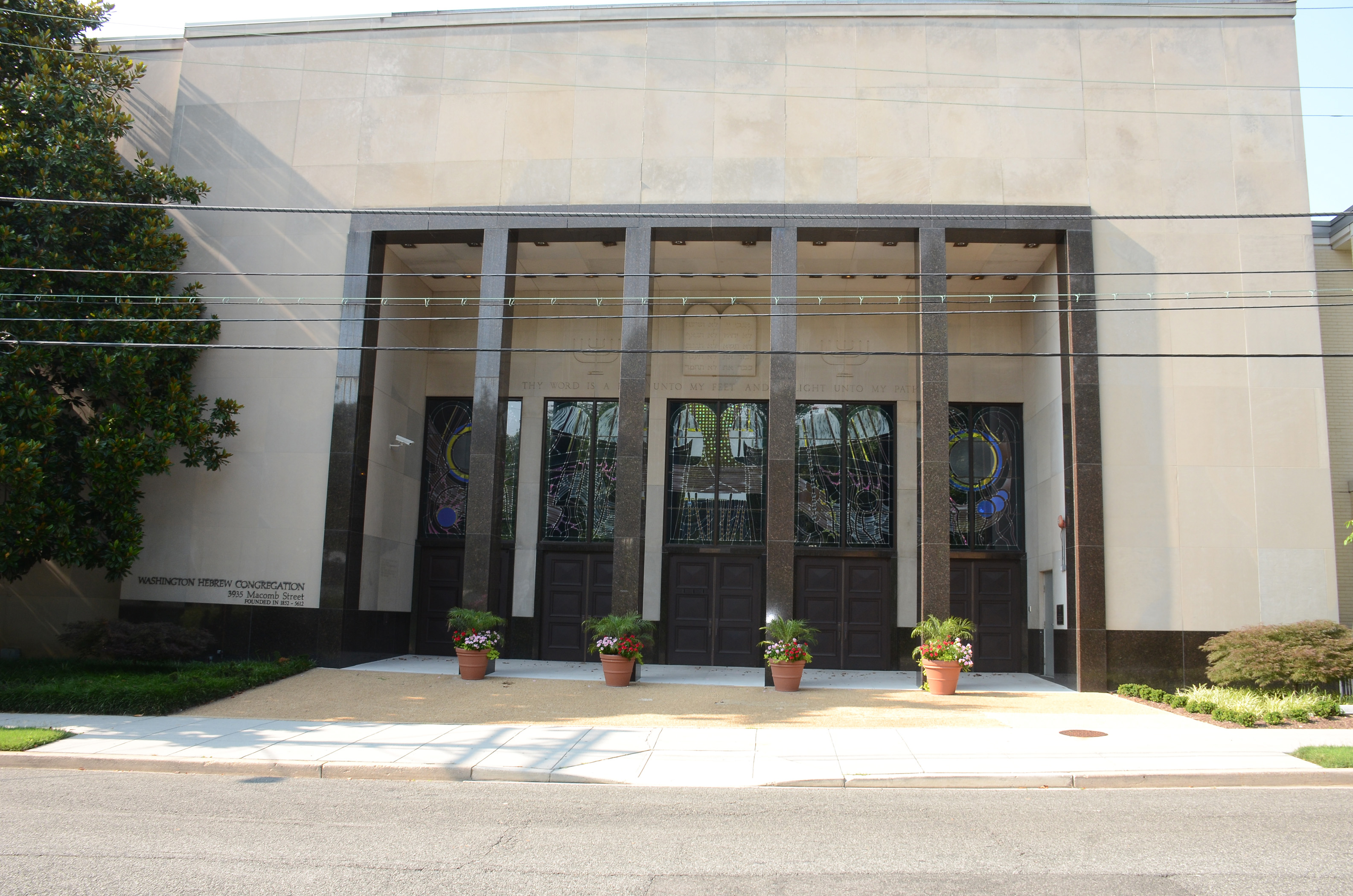
- Washington Hebrew synagogue in 2014

- Location in Washington, D.C.

Religion
- Affiliation: Reform Judaism
- Ecclesiastical or organisational status: Synagogue
- Leadership: Rabbi Susan Shankman; Rabbi Aaron Miller; Rabbi Eliana Fischel (Associate); Cantor Susan Bortnick Cantor Suzanne Hamstra Rabbi Rachel Schmelkin
- Status: Active

Location
- Location: 3935 Macomb Street NW, Washington, D.C. 20016
- Country: United States
- Coordinates: 38°56′01″N 77°04′41″W

Architecture
- Established: 1852 (as a congregation)
- Completed: 1955 (Macomb Street); 1978 (Potomac, Maryland)

Website
- whctemple.org

Washington Hebrew Congregation, abbreviated as WHC, is a Reform Jewish synagogue location at 3935 Macomb Street NW, in Washington, D.C., in the United States. Established as a congregation in 1852, the congregation manages two places of worship, the temple in Washington, D.C., completed in 1955, and the Julia Bindeman Suburban Center, a community center, located at 11810 Falls Road, Potomac, Maryland, completed in 1978.

The congregation is a member of the Union for Reform Judaism, and across its two sites, it is one of the largest Reform congregations in the United States, with 2,150 members as of April 2023.

== History ==
=== Founding ===
Washington Hebrew Congregation was the first Jewish congregation in the nation's capital, formed on April 25, 1852, when 21 German Jewish men gathered at the home of Herman Listberger on Pennsylvania Avenue near 21st Street in Washington, D.C. Solomon Pribram was elected the congregation's first president, and Capt. Jonas P. Levy, a naval commander during the Mexican-American War, made the first recorded monetary contribution.

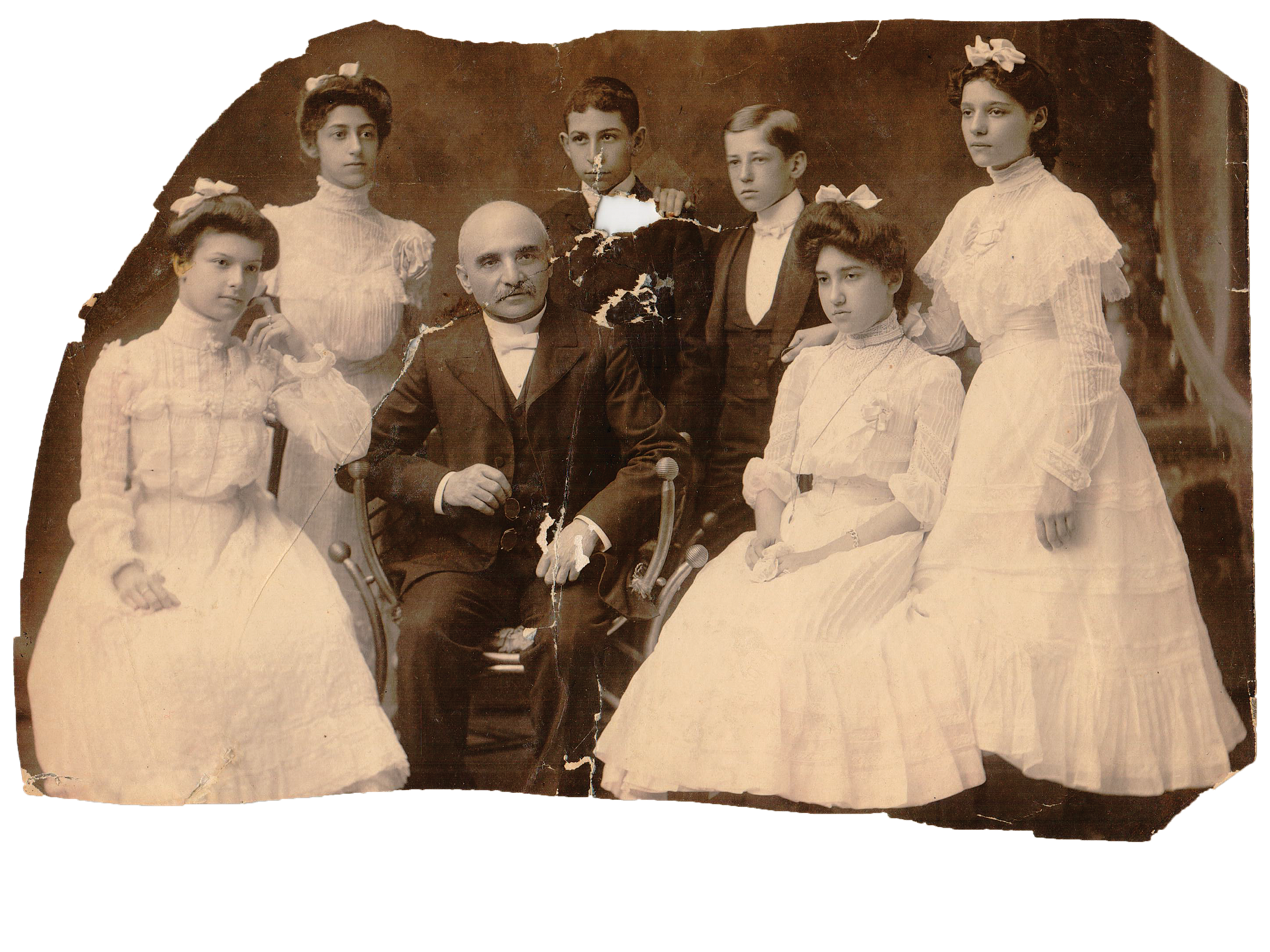
Senior Rabbi Louis Stern presides over this Washington Hebrew Congregation 1901 Confirmation class.

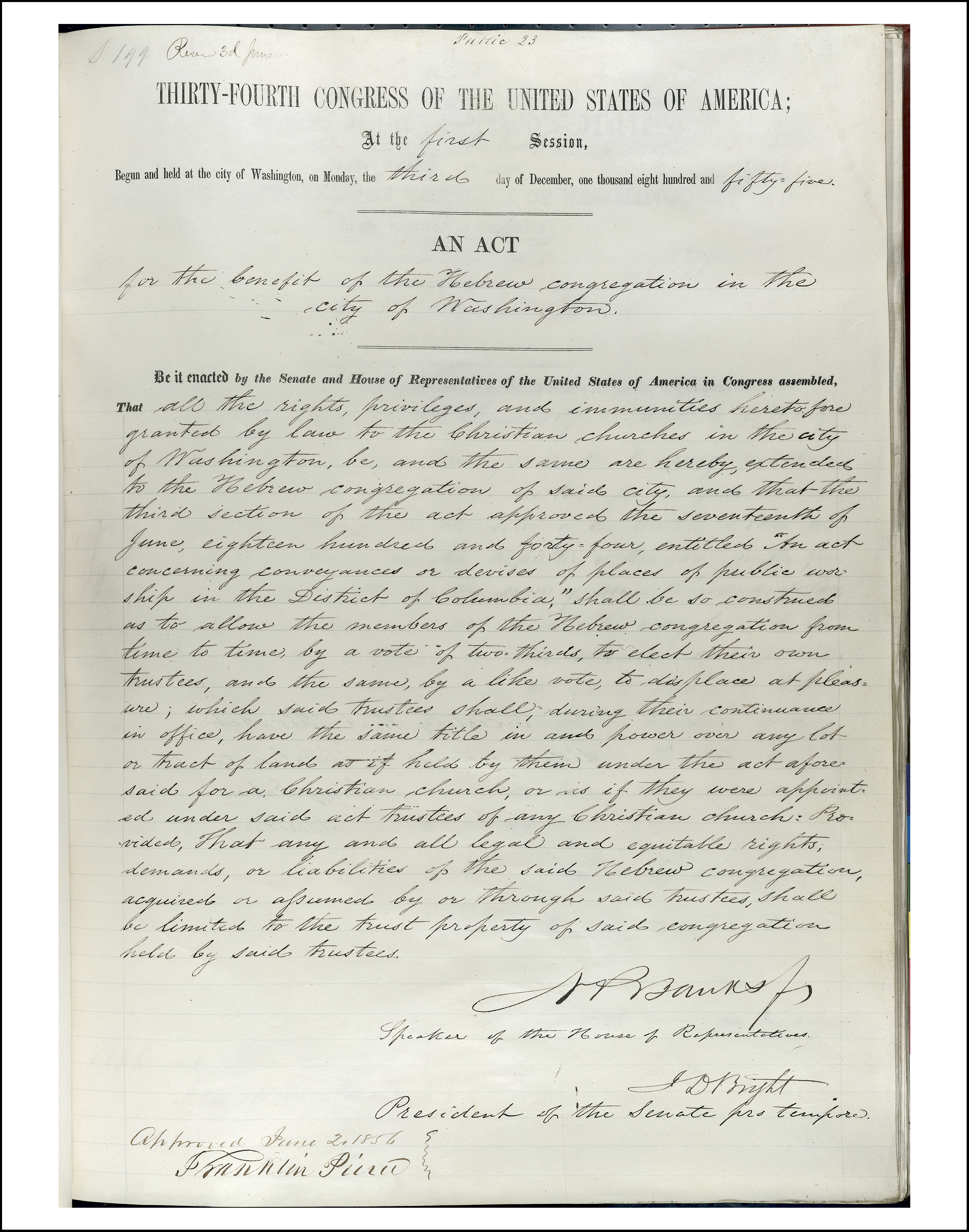
1856 Act of Congress, signed by President Franklin Pierce, allowing Washington Hebrew Congregation (and future Jewish organizations), to purchase land and property in Washington, D.C.

Concerned that U.S. law did not grant them the right to purchase land for a synagogue, Capt. Jonas P. Levy and other founders of the congregation submitted a petition to the 34th U. S. Congress on February 5, 1856. On June 2, 1856, President Franklin Pierce signed into law An Act for the Benefit of the Hebrew Congregation in the City of Washington, ensuring its right to own property in the District of Columbia. To this day, Washington Hebrew Congregation operates the only synagogue chartered by an act of Congress.

Prior to 1870, the congregation had two competing factions. German-Jewish immigrants had brought with them the Sulzbach (Bavarian) machzor, the machzor used by almost all Jews from southern Germany, and they were strongly Orthodox. Some congregants who objected to the Bavarian machzor briefly split off from the congregation in the 1850s, but quickly reunited later. Services were conducted entirely in Hebrew until 1861, when the two rival factions signed a new constitution. Until 1861, the siddur used during services was Rabbi Isaac Mayer Wise's 1857 Minhag America, which included text in German, English, and Hebrew. In 1861, the Roedelheim (Frankfort on the Main) siddur was adopted, which had a traditional Orthodox liturgy with both Hebrew and German text. The synagogue later adopted the Reform siddur Union Prayer Book, following its publication in 1892.

Washington Hebrew grew steadily in membership and in influence; in 1863 it purchased for $8,000.00 the 8th and I Street NW site, a former Methodist church, which had been used by the government as a hospital during the Civil War. It refurbished the building and held a grand dedication ceremony on July 31, 1863. The building was renovated in 1877 and again in 1886 before it was ultimately torn down to make way for a new Washington Hebrew Temple on the same site. Washington Hebrew Congregation started a religious school in 1861 and held its first confirmation class in 1871.

=== WHC in the Civil War ===
Among the many Washington Hebrew members who fought in the Civil War, Leopold Karpeles (1838–1909) was a flagbearer for the Union Army and received the Medal of Honor in 1870 for his actions in the battles of the Wilderness and North Anna, the first Jew to be awarded the Medal of Honor.

Jewish soldiers fought on both sides in the Civil War, and the Washington Hebrew Congregation helped ease wartime suffering. During the war, the women of the Washington Hebrew Congregation raised money for the U.S. Sanitary Commission, which administered wartime relief to soldiers and their families. The congregation's visiting nursing corps ministered to injured Jewish soldiers. Unclaimed bodies of Jewish war dead were buried in the congregation's cemetery.

=== WHC Builds a Jewish Cemetery ===
In the 1850s, WHC purchased land for a small cemetery on what was then Hamilton Road (which later became Alabama Ave. SE), but its size proved to be inadequate. The Temple sold that land in 1885 for $85.00 with a $5.00 commission.

WHC purchased 3 acres of land in October 1878 on Alabama Ave. SE for $450. That is equivalent to $13,410.00 in today's money (2023). In July 1889, the Temple purchased an additional 4 acres adjoining this property.

The two indentures (deeds) are seen in the adjacent document. The first indenture tells us of the history of who previously owned the land, where it is, and that it is free and clear and able to be purchased without concern. The second indenture tells us that WHC trustees purchased the 3 acres from a George and Josephine Mason for $450.00 in October 1878.

Official deed recording from 1878

=== Growth and expansion ===
From 1897 to 1954, the congregation met at 816 Eighth Street NW, in a building designed by Washington architects Louis F. Stutz and Frank W. Pease. The cornerstone of this building was laid on September 16, 1897, by President William McKinley. This building was sold to New Hope Baptist Church (later Greater New Hope Baptist Church) in March 1954.

By 1905, the First Washington Hebrew Congregation was the only Reform congregation in the District of Columbia, with a membership of 350, and a religious school attended by 200 children.

Adas Israel Congregation, with Isaac Stampel as hazzan, was founded in 1869 by 69 members of the Washington Hebrew Congregation who objected to the Reform tendencies of the old congregation.

In 1952, President Harry S. Truman laid the cornerstone of the congregation's current home on Macomb Street NW, which was dedicated on May 6, 1955, by President Dwight D. Eisenhower.

By the 1970s, in order to meet the needs of a growing congregation and as members moved out of the District to the suburbs, an additional facility was built. The Julia Bindeman Suburban Center in Potomac, Maryland opened in 1978.

=== Civil Rights activities ===
In the summer of 1966, a group of young Jewish activists urged the synagogue's rabbi, Rabbi Norman Gerstenfeld, to denounce a white Jewish landlord named Allie Freed for engaging in racist housing practices against African-Americans. After Rabbi Gerstenfeld refused to denounce Freed, Jewish members of ACCESS (Action Coordinating Committee to End Segregation in the Suburbs) leafleted the congregation during Yom Kippur in 1966 and 1967. They were condemned by Jason R. Silverman of the Anti-Defamation League of B'nai B'rith for protesting on Yom Kippur. In light of this, Jewish activists founded Jews for Urban Justice in order to campaign against anti-black racism within white Jewish communities.

== Facilities ==
Washington Hebrew Congregation owns two buildings in the Washington, D.C. area and partners with other Jewish organizations on others.

=== Macomb St. Temple ===
In 1952, President Harry S. Truman laid the cornerstone of the congregation's current home on Macomb Street NW, which was dedicated on May 6, 1955, by President Dwight D. Eisenhower. Expanded and renovated over the years, the Temple is nestled in between Rock Creek National Park and the residential neighborhood of McLean Gardens. In addition to multiple worship spaces, the building houses a Religious School, Edlavitch-Tyser Early Childhood Center, and several social halls and meeting spaces.

=== Julia Bindeman Suburban Center ===
Dedicated in 1978, the Julia Bindeman Suburban Center was erected to meet the needs of a growing congregation, as members moved out of the District to the suburbs. The building houses the Rabbi Joseph P. Weinberg Early Childhood Center and the Temple Religious School. In addition, many Temple auxiliaries hold social and educational programs at the facility. The building also has social halls and reception areas available for rental.

=== Washington Hebrew Congregation Memorial Park ===
Washington Hebrew Congregation made a cemetery a first priority. It purchased a small plot on Hamilton Road (now Alabama Avenue, SE) in the early 1850s, before moving to an area adjacent to Adas Israel's land in 1879.

=== Garden of Remembrance (Gan Zikaron) Memorial Park ===
Washington Hebrew Congregation organized a 152-acre nonprofit cemetery, Garden of Remembrance (Gan Zikaron) Memorial Park, in Clarksburg, Maryland. It opened for use by the entire Washington area Jewish community in 2000.

== Early Childhood Center sexual abuse allegations ==
In August 2018 the synagogue reported to community parents that it had learned of, and taken actions in response to, allegations that an employee at its Macomb Street Edlavitch-Tyser Early Childhood Center may have engaged in inappropriate conduct involving one or more children. According to a January 2020 report, the alleged victims were 14 or 15 children, ages two to four. The teacher who was accused of abuse was hired by the preschool in March 2016, was placed on administrative leave in August 2016, and fired in October 2018.

The D.C. Metropolitan Police and the U.S. Attorney for the District of Columbia concluded a 16-month criminal investigation of the alleged abuser in January 2020, closing the case without filing any charges. A police statement explained that "after exhausting all investigative avenues, the universal determination of the investigative team was that there was insufficient probable cause to establish that an offense occurred or to make an arrest." Radley Balko, a criminal justice reporter, called it an "unusual, strongly-worded public statement" announcing that there wasn't enough evidence to arrest, let alone convict, the alleged perpetrator.

However, the D.C. Office of the State Superintendent of Education stated, in a June 2019 cease-and desist letter to the congregation, that it found that "more than one child was a victim of sexual abuse by the alleged maltreator." Evidence was not given for its determination that sexual abuse had occurred. The office would eventually determine that the preschool failed to ensure the safety of children under its care, failed to properly supervise children, and failed to comply with reporting requirements.

The D.C. Attorney General's Office also investigated the allegations, but no charges were ever filled. Balko compared the allegations to the Day-care sex-abuse hysteria of the 1980s and 90s, given that the alleged teacher was never charged for any crimes. A child psychiatrist with Johns Hopkins University said that "All the indices I’ve seen in previous false accusation cases were present in this case."

In April 2019, some parents of alleged victims filed a civil lawsuit against the congregation and Deborah “DJ” Schneider Jensen, head of school for early childhood education, alleging that they were negligent amid "systemic, regular sexual abuse." Jensen was placed on administrative leave in April 2019, and subsequently left the center. According to a February 2020 report, that case was scheduled to go to trial in early 2021. Another group of parents filed a separate civil lawsuit in May 2019. The lead attorney of one of law firms representing the parents, Cohen Milstein, would be arrested in March 2023 on charges of consuming child sexual abuse material. Shortly after the charges against the attorney were announced, two of the families suing the school settled with the school.

In May 2025, the D.C. Child and Family services agency announced that the accusations against the teacher were "unfounded".

== Antisemitic graffiti ==
In October 2019 the synagogue was vandalized with graffiti including, according to the police report, "numerous anti-Semitic statements, profane language, and child-like drawings of male and female genitalia." This incident was one among several antisemitic hate crimes targeting that synagogue, as well as others in the region.

== Notable members ==
- Josh Harris (born 1964), investor and sports team owner
- Abby Meyers (born 1999), basketball player
