= Congregation Kol Ami of Frederick =

Reform synagogue in Frederick, Maryland, US

Congregation Kol Ami
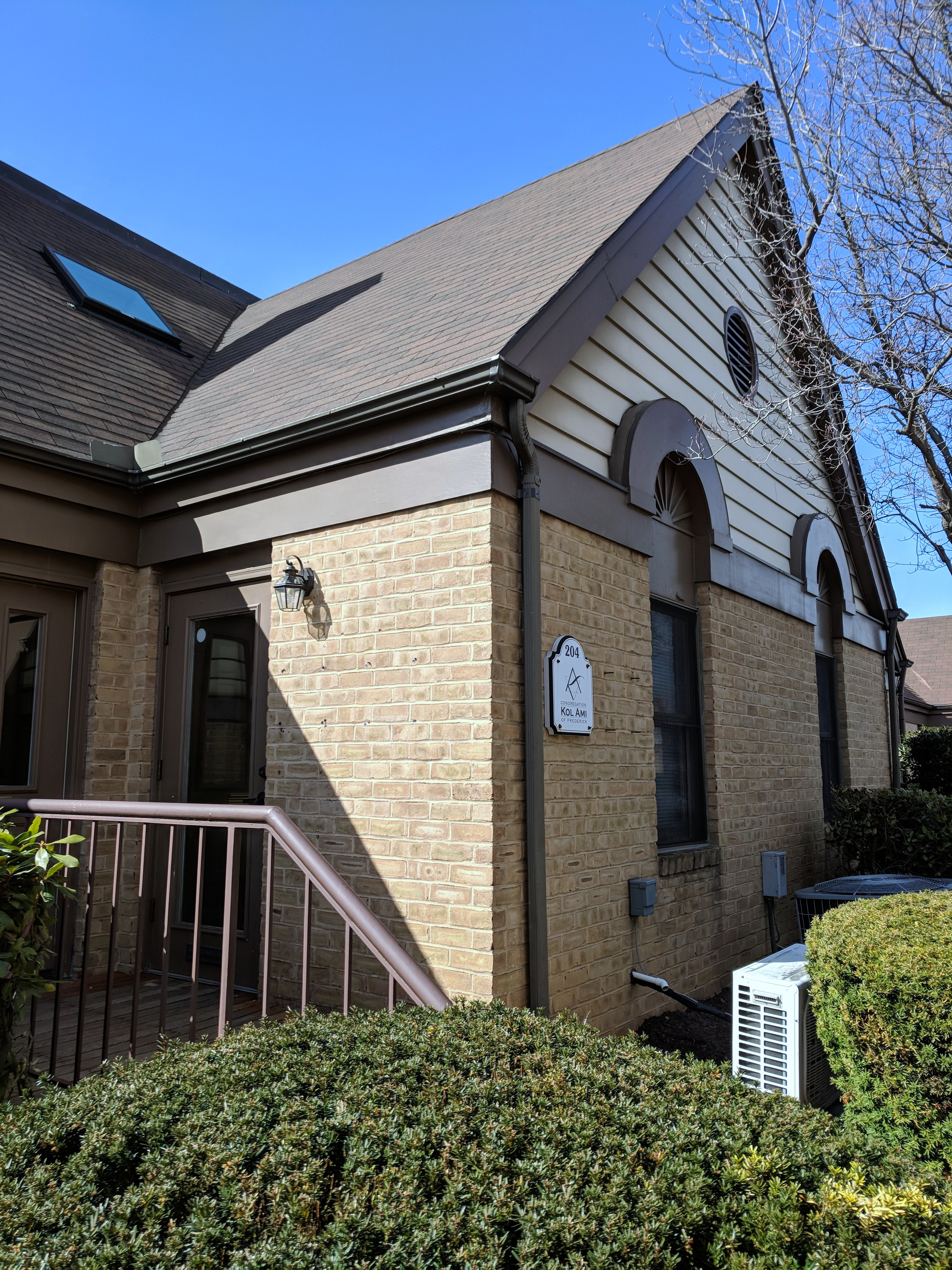
- Kol Ami of Frederick, in 2018

- Location in Maryland

Religion
- Affiliation: Reform Judaism
- Ecclesiastical or organisational status: Synagogue
- Leadership: Rabbi Jennifer Weiner
- Status: Active

Location
- Location: 4880 Elmer Derr Road, Frederick, Maryland 21703
- Country: United States
- Coordinates: 39°24′51.5″N 77°24′48.5″W

Architecture
- Type: Church
- Established: 2003 (as a congregation)

Website
- kolamifrederick.org

Congregation Kol Ami is a Reform Jewish congregation and synagogue in Frederick, Maryland, in the United States.

== History ==
Founded by a group of eight families on February 21, 2003, the congregation's services are held at Unitarian-Universalist Congregation of Frederick church at 4880 Elmer Derr Road. In 2004, the congregation borrowed a Torah for use in worship and in 2005, Kol Ami hired a trainee rabbi, Daniel Sikowitz. The same year, Kol Ami began its religious school, and joined the Union for Reform Judaism. Sikowitz was elected as the congregation's first rabbi in 2007.

In October 2007, a group of women at Kol Ami celebrated their b'not mitzvahs. The women, who varied in age, were older than the traditional age for such a celebration, however had never had such an opportunity since the tradition was not popular when they were that age.

Congregation Kol Ami paid $20,000 for a Torah saved from the Holocaust from Lviv, Ukraine in 2008. It was the first Torah scroll owned by the congregation. Members of the congregation, some of whom are of Ukrainian descent, assisted in writing the Torah.

The congregation frequently participates in social action programs such as the Frederick food bank.

== The Torah with false provenance ==
The Torah that was sold to the congregation by Rabbi Menachem Youlus from Save a Torah Foundation, an organization that brings forgotten Torahs to welcoming congregations, was purportedly acquired on the basis of the following provenance:

Prior to World War II, Lvov was a major center of Jewish life with over 200,000 Jewish inhabitants. The Jews represented the vast array of Jewish practice, from Reform Jews to the Orthodox. When the Nazis invaded Ukraine, they let the Ukrainians round up all the Jews and lock them in their synagogues. They then set fire to them. A priest saved the several Torahs from destruction. It laid in the basement of a monastery for decades. Then, an arts dealer bought the Torahs from the church. Youlus then ripped it apart and sold the parchment for canvas to artists. Youlus asked the arts dealer for Torah parchment. The man said you have the weekend to assemble all the Torahs and pay for what you have. In the storeroom there were piles of ripped up Torahs and Youlus assembled twenty-two of them.

One of these Torahs was purportedly reassembled and was sold as a genuine item to Congregation Kol Ami.

An investigation by the Washington Post cast doubts on the authenticity of Youlus' claims and other Torah scrolls purportedly discovered to have survived the Holocaust and recovered by Youlus and the Save a Torah Foundation. Following a criminal investigation, Youlus was convicted of two counts of mail and wire fraud in a Manhattan federal court on October 11, 2012. He served a 51-month prison sentence and was ordered to pay restitution to his victims. Youlus was incarcerated until August 26, 2016, and served three year supervised release.

== See also ==
- History of the Jews in Maryland
- Beth Sholom Congregation, a Conservative synagogue in Frederick
