= Winands Road Synagogue Center =

Former Orthodox Jewish congregation in Randallstown, Maryland

- Location in Maryland

Religion
- Affiliation: Orthodox Judaism
- Ecclesiastical or organisational status: Synagogue
- Leadership: Rabbi Sholom Salfer
- Status: Closed

Location
- Location: 8701 Winands Rd, Randallstown, Maryland
- Country: United States
- Coordinates: 39°22′49″N 76°46′54″W

Architecture
- Type: Synagogue
- Established: 1968

Winands Road Synagogue Center was an Orthodox Jewish congregation in Randallstown, Maryland, active from 1968 until its closure in 2019. Formed from the merger of multiple Baltimore congregations, it served as the last synagogue in the Randallstown area and merged with Beth Tfiloh Congregation shortly before discontinuing operations.

== Early history ==
The origins of Winands Road Synagogue Center trace back to an amalgamation of multiple Jewish congregations in the Baltimore area. These congregations included Beth Yehuda, Beth Jacob Anshe Kurland, Kneseth Israel Anshe Sphard, Anshe Kolk-Wolyn, and B’nai Reuben, with Beth Jacob Anshe Kurland being the oldest, established in 1895. In 1968, the merged congregation moved to its location at 8701 Winands Road at the intersection with Carthage Road in Randallstown, Maryland, where it would remain until its closure.

Rabbi Sholom Salfer became the synagogue's spiritual leader in September 1976. Under his leadership, Winands Road Synagogue Center continued to serve a diverse and aging congregation, which included longtime members from other area synagogues that had since closed. Salfer was one of the longest-serving rabbis in the Baltimore area, and his tenure lasted until the synagogue's eventual closure.

== Community challenges and decline ==
During the 1970s and 1980s, Randallstown and the Liberty Road corridor were home to a thriving Jewish community, with several synagogues, including Adath Yeshurun, Beth Israel, Liberty Jewish Center, Moses Montefiore-Woodmoor Hebrew Congregation, and Temple Emanuel. In March 1990, the congregation celebrated a mortgage burning ceremony, marking the payoff of its mortgage.

Demographic changes led to a steady decline in the area's Jewish population over the ensuing decades. By the 2000s, the number of active congregants had diminished significantly, with membership down to approximately 100 families. The congregation faced financial difficulties, operating with a budget deficit of $30,000-$40,000 annually in the years leading up to its closure. Winands Road Synagogue continued to hold daily minyanim, with services every morning, evening, and on Shabbat.

=== Decision to close and merge with Beth Tfiloh ===
On November 16, 2016, the synagogue's board of directors passed a resolution to shut down operations, citing a lack of financial resources and the aging of its membership. The congregation initially planned to close by mid-2017, with discussions suggesting it would cease operations after Shavuot of that year, though it remained open until early 2018.

On March 27, 2018, Winands Road Synagogue Center held its final Shabbat services, and shortly thereafter, the board approved a merger with Beth Tfiloh Congregation in Pikesville, Maryland. The merger was effective on March 29, 2018, with Beth Tfiloh's board extending an invitation to Winands Road Synagogue members to join their congregation. On April 14, 2018, Beth Tfiloh formally welcomed the former members of Winands Road Synagogue during Shabbat services.

The final minyan at Winands Road Synagogue Center took place on May 27, 2019. Plans for the property's sale were made following the closure. The synagogue's cemetery was transferred to the Jewish Cemetery Association of Greater Baltimore. Winands Road Synagogue Center's closure marked the end of the Jewish congregation presence in Randallstown.

== See also ==
- History of the Jews in Maryland
