= Beth Sholom Congregation (Frederick, Maryland) =

Conservative synagogue, in Frederick, Maryland, US

- Location in Maryland

Religion
- Affiliation: Conservative Judaism
- Ecclesiastical or organizational status: Synagogue
- Leadership: Rabbi Jordan Hersh
- Status: Active

Location
- Location: 1011 North Market Street, Frederick, Maryland 21701
- Country: United States
- Interactive map of Beth Sholom Congregation
- Coordinates: 39°25′40″N 77°24′29″W

Architecture
- Established: 1919 (as a congregation)
- Completed: 1923 (West Second Street); 1984 (North Market Street)

Website
- bethsholomfrederick.org

Beth Sholom Congregation is a Conservative Jewish congregation and synagogue, located at 1011 North Market Street, in Frederick, Maryland, United States.

== History ==
Frederick Hebrew Congregation was founded in Frederick City in c. 1840. Services were initially held in the homes of its early members before moving to the Masonic Temple. On October 7, 1917, Beth Sholom Synagogue was incorporated with the mission of furthering the cause of Judaism and to build a synagogue for the congregation in Frederick. The first synagogue was built in Brunswick, Maryland, that same year. For several years, religious services were held in a room in a Masonic Temple. Members donated $18,000 for the renovations of a former Elks Club building on West Second Street to make it suitable as a synagogue.

On September 2, 1923, the synagogue was dedicated. Rabbi Menahem J. Friedman was the congregation's spiritual leader at the time of the dedication, although he resigned later that month and moved to Baltimore. Rabbi W. Willner succeeded Rabbi Friedman.

Beth Sholom built a community center in Frederick in 1984. The community center was intended for the preschool, religious school, youth activities, and social activities. A new, larger community center was opened in 1994.

== Rabbinical leaders ==
Yehuda E. Perkins was the rabbi in 1959.

Rabbi Morris Kosman, a Detroit native who had served as the congregation's spiritual leader since 1961, retired and assumed emeritus status in 2010. Kosman died October 22, 2016.

Rabbi Murray Singerman became the congregation's new spiritual leader in 2010. After a year and a half, Singerman resigned, and Beth Sholom was served until July 2014 by a visiting rabbi from the Jewish Theological Seminary in New York under the Gladstein Fellowship program, Rabbi Jordan Hersh and his wife, Cantor Shulie Hersh. Rabbi Hersch is an alumnus of Rabbis without Borders. In July 2014, Rabbi Hersh was appointed as the permanent rabbi of Beth Sholom. Rabbi Hersh is also the only chaplain in Maryland's Army National Guard; he was called to serve and protect the Capitol in the wake of the insurrection on January 6, 2021.

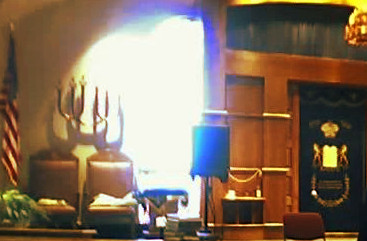
The sanctuary at Beth Sholom's community center location

== See also ==
- History of the Jews in Maryland
