= Gladstein Fellowship =

The Gladstein Fellowship is a program operated by the Jewish Theological Seminary allowing selected students of the seminary to serve in the capacity of rabbi of a selected congregation.

Congregations selected by JTS to benefit from the Gladstein Fellowship program are offered three Gladstein fellows each for a two-year period for a total of six years with the option of hiring any of the fellows to a permanent position. Gladstein fellows normally visit the congregations for which they are selected monthly, are available to congregants by phone and email at other times, and receive a stipend in exchange for their services.

== History ==
The Gladstein Fellowship program was founded by Ned and Jane Gladstein in 2003. The first congregation to benefit from the program was Loudon Jewish Congregation in Leesburg, Virginia.

== List of benefiting congregations ==
Congregation name	Location	Years	Fellows
Sha’are Shalom	Leesburg, Virginia	2006-2010	Michael Ragozin
Beth Shalom	Lake Norman, North Carolina		Adam Baldachin (2011–13)
Beth Sholom	Frederick, Maryland	2013-	Jordan Hersh (2013–15)
New Stoke Newington Shul	London, England	2013-2015	Roni Tabick (2013–15)(Roni became synagogue's rabbi after ordination in 2015)
Chevrei Tzedek Congregation	Baltimore, Maryland	2015-2019	Emily Barton (2015–17); Rory Katz (2017-2019 and hired after ordination)
Congregation Eitz Chaim	Monroe, New York	2016–Present	Louis Polisson (2016-2018) Ariana Siegel (2018–2020)
Congregation Agudath Achim	Little Rock, Arkansas	2019-2021	Ben Freed (2019-2021)
