= Jews for Urban Justice =

- Founded: 1966
- Dissolved: 1971
- Purpose: Anti-racism, Anti-imperialism, Socialism, and Social justice
- Location: Washington, D.C., United States

Jews for Urban Justice (JUJ) was a Jewish-American left-wing activist organization based in Washington, D.C., and its suburbs. The organization was founded to oppose anti-black racism within the predominantly white Jewish community of Washington, D.C.

== History ==
Jews for Urban Justice was created by young Jewish intellectuals in the Summer of 1966 to oppose anti-black racism from white Jewish landlords and businesspeople, which they felt fueled antisemitism in the African-American community. Alleging that white Jews and predominantly white Jewish institutions were "part of the power structure" and that white Jews "gyp and rob" African-Americans in the ghetto, JUJ urged rabbis and other Jewish community leaders to address the problems of racism and classism within the Jewish community. Jews for Justice fought for equal access to housing for African-Americans at a time when white Jewish land developers in the DC metropolitan area used racially restrictive covenants that excluded African-Americans and other people of color from buying homes in white Jewish neighborhoods.

JUJ was involved in Martin Luther King Jr.'s Poor People's Campaign, the Mothers Day Welfare Rights March, and the Delano grape strike. In solidarity with the United Farm Workers strike, JUJ urged synagogues and rabbis in the DC area to forgo using California grapes in their sukkahs. JUJ succeeded in convincing Joseph Danzansky to stop carrying California grapes at Giant Food grocery store locations.

JUJ helped organize the Freedom Seder on the third night of Pesach, April 4, 1969, the anniversary of the assassination of Martin Luther King Jr. Arthur Waskow, a JUJ member and Jewish Renewal rabbi, was instrumental in creating the Freedom Seder. Waskow created a new Haggadah for the seder, saying "I wove the story of the liberation of ancient Hebrews from Pharaoh with the liberation struggles of black America, of the Vietnamese people, passages from Dr. King, from Gandhi." 800 people gathered for the Freedom Seder at the Lincoln Temple, an historically black Protestant church in Washington, D.C., bringing together blacks, whites, Christians, and Jews. The seder was attended by prominent black civil rights leaders, including Reverend Channing E. Phillips and Topper Carew.

In 1970, JUJ released a manifesto titled "The Oppression and Liberation of the Jewish People in America", outlining their ideology as an anti-racist, anti-war, Jewish socialist organization that was critical of the mainstream Jewish establishment. The manifesto calls for white Jewish solidarity with African-American, Native American, Chicano, Italian-American, and Appalachian communities. The JUJ manifesto is critical of Israeli policy towards Palestinians and supports Palestinian self-determination, but is not explicitly anti-Zionist. JUJ's manifesto critiqued conflating Zionism with Jewishness and objected to antisemitic expressions of anti-Zionism.

We call upon the Jewish people to free itself by joining in alliance with others to abolish the Amerikan empire that now oppresses the Jewish people and many other peoples at home and much of the human race outside. We call upon the Jewish people to join the task of creating a democratic, communitarian, libertarian, and socialist society in America. We believe that a fully socialist society will be one in which many self-governing communities are able to end the alienations of mind and body, of politics from economics, of spirit from work, of individual from collective, and thus to create the new, unalienated person; that these communities will differ freely from each other in the shapes they give to the wholeness they make out of their previously alienated lives; and that among these communities a liberated Jewish people will joyfully take its place.

— The Oppression and Liberation of the Jewish People in America

== See also ==
- African American–Jewish relations
- History of the Jews in Washington, D.C.
- Jewish left
