= Temple Kol Ami (Fort Mill, South Carolina) =

Reform synagogue in Fort Mill, South Carolina, US

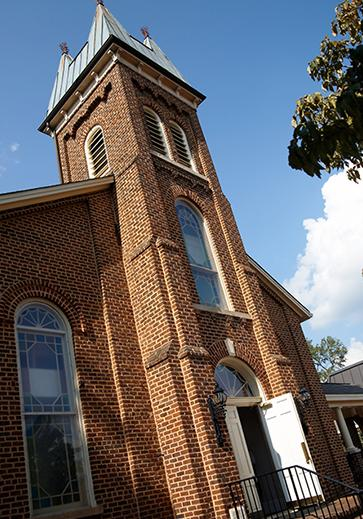
- The synagogue, in

- Location in South Carolina

Religion
- Affiliation: Reform Judaism
- Ecclesiastical or organisational status: Synagogue
- Leadership: Rabbi Ana Bonnheim; Rabbi Bruce Aft (Associate)
- Status: Active

Location
- Location: 2764 Pleasant Road #11423, Fort Mill, York County, South Carolina 29708
- Country: United States
- Coordinates: 34°59′17″N 80°56′40″W

Architecture
- Established: 2010 (as a congregation)

Website
- templekolamisc.org

Temple Kol Ami is a Reform Jewish congregation and synagogue located in Fort Mill, York County, South Carolina, in the United States. The congregation was founded in 2010, and is one of two Jewish congregations in York County, and one of eleven synagogues in the Charlotte metropolitan area.

== History ==
The history of Jews in York County dates back to as early as the 1860s, when Arnold Friedheim, a German Jewish immigrant settled in Rock Hill, SC. After the Civil War, he was joined by his brothers Julius and August. Together they opened A. Friedheim and Brothers, which would eventually become Rock Hill's largest department store. Jewish families, however, did not immigrate in significant numbers until the early 1900s, mostly Eastern European Jews from Poland and Russia who were merchants.

The first Jewish congregation created in York County was Beth El, begun in 1922 by eight Jewish families in Rock Hill. Meeting in homes and eventually a storefront, by 1933 the congregation constructed its first building on Main Street in Rock Hill. The congregation never had a full-time rabbi, but itinerant rabbis and cantors who would lead High Holy Days services. Cantor George Ackerman served the congregation for many years until it closed in 1963 due to lack of membership. Its Torah scrolls and Judaica were subsequently donated to Beth Israel synagogue in Whiteville, NC.

For the next fifty years, no formal Jewish congregation existed in York County. The few Jewish families that resided in the area attended services either in nearby Charlotte or Gastonia, both in North Carolina. However, as Charlotte became a financial center with Bank of America establishing its national headquarters in the city, and with the influx of retired northeastern Jews, the Jewish population of Charlotte and the surrounding areas (including York County) began to prosper and grow.

In the spring of 2010, two men, rabbinical student Jonathan Cohen and Jonathan Shaw, discussed the idea of creating a Jewish congregation in York County. Initially, conceived as a minyan, the rapid response and number of Jewish families necessitated establishing a formal congregation. Shaw was elected the first President and Cohen assumed the role of spiritual leader. On June 4, 2010, more than 170 people gathered for the first service of the new "Temple Kol Ami." Meeting in various locations, the synagogue eventually found a home at St. Phillipe Neri Catholic Church in Fort Mill. Meeting there until June 2011, the synagogue has since relocated.

== Today ==
Today, the congregation has more than 70 member families with a part-time rabbi and a Religious School. Shabbat services are held every first and third Shabbat. In September 2011, a Torah scroll was donated to the congregation by Temple Beth Israel, in Niagara Falls, New York, after it announced it was disbanding in 2012. Temple Kol Ami obtained a second Torah scroll in 2020.
