= Marvell Scott =

American journalist

Marvell Scott (born February 28, 1973) is a physician and former journalist.

He is a graduate of Wheaton Central High School in Wheaton, Illinois, a graduate of the University of Delaware and a graduate of Wright State University Boonshoft School of Medicine.

Scott was recruited from high school, and played as a football running back at the University of Illinois, in the Big Ten conference. He played two seasons as a professional indoor football player in addition to playing semi-pro baseball as a pitcher. He also won a state championship in bodybuilding as a teen.

In 2002, Scott joined WABC-TV as its weekend sports reporter.

Scott is a New York state-licensed, nationally board-certified medical doctor, with an emphasis on preventive care and sports medicine. He is also a nationally-accredited exercise and performance expert who designs specialized fitness and wellness programs.

== Legal controversy ==
In February 2010, Scott was to be arraigned on second-degree rape charges. The New York Daily News reported that the victim was a 14-year-old child runaway, coerced into prostitution by an adult male. On August 14, 2011, Scott pleaded guilty to misdemeanor injuring the welfare of a child in the case in a plea agreement in which he would get 20 days of community service and ultimately have his record cleared.

In June 2015, Scott was reported to be a victim in an extortion plot hatched by an exotic dancer he had developed a romantic relationship with after meeting her at a strip club. The dancer reportedly recorded video of Scott snorting a "white powdery substance" and, along with two friends, threatened Scott with releasing the video to the news media and the medical disciplinary board if Scott didn't pay the extortionists $100,000. The extortionists were eventually all identified and charged in the scheme.
