= Menachem Youlus =

Baltimore rabbi and convicted criminal

- Known for: Selling Torahs with false Holocaust provence
- Status: Released on August 26, 2016; time served
- Convictions: Mail fraud (2012); Wire fraud (2012)
- Penalty: 51 months incarceration; 3 years of supervised release; $990,366 victim restitution; $862,044 to the U.S. government

Details
- Country: United States
- Date apprehended: August 24, 2011
- Imprisoned at: Federal Correctional Institution, Otisville (2012—2016)

Personal life
- Occupation: Co-owner, Jewish Bookstore of Greater Washington, Wheaton, Maryland

Religious life
- Religion: Judaism
- Denomination: Orthodox Judaism

Jewish leader
- Position: Founder
- Organisation: Save a Torah Foundation
- Began: 2004
- Ended: 2011

Menachem Youlus is a Baltimore rabbi and Torah scribe who sold Torah scrolls at inflated prices by falsely representing them as Holocaust-era Torahs he had rescued from Eastern Europe. On August 24, 2011, he was arrested on charges of mail fraud and wire fraud, and he pleaded guilty on February 2, 2012.

He was convicted of two counts of mail and wire fraud in a Manhattan federal court on October 11, 2012. On December 17, 2012, Youlus began serving a 51-month prison sentence at the federal correctional institution in Otisville, New York. Youlus was incarcerated until August 26, 2016.

== False claims ==
The co-owner of the Jewish Bookstore of Greater Washington in Wheaton, Maryland, Youlus claimed he had personally traveled to Eastern Europe and beyond to recover Torah scrolls lost or hidden during the Holocaust, including some from the sites of concentration camps at Auschwitz and Bergen-Belsen. He said that during his travels he had been beaten and imprisoned, and called himself the "Jewish Indiana Jones" during a Torah dedication in 2004. In court, he admitted that from 2004 to 2010 he had made up the stories of his travels; he had never been to the places he had claimed. The Torahs he sold did not have the claimed provenance.

== Save a Torah foundation ==
Youlus created the non-profit foundation "Save a Torah", purportedly to finance his travels and the restoration of the rescued Torah scrolls, dedicated to rescuing and restoring Torah scrolls hidden, lost or stolen during the Holocaust and other world upheavals and placing them in Jewish congregations. Between 2004 and 2010, Save a Torah received over $1.4 million in contributions from over 800 donors, to assist in rescuing and restoring the Torahs. Instead Youlus sold the Torah scrolls he had obtained by other means, partly at inflated prices. According to prosecutors, he defrauded the charity and its donors of $862,000.

Congregations that acquired Torah scrolls from Save a Torah included New York's Central Synagogue, Congregation Kol Ami of Frederick, and others.

In January 2010, the Washington Post reported that many Torahs purportedly rescued from Holocaust sites in Eastern Europe appeared to be old Torah scrolls mostly acquired when American congregations closed, and resold at high prices because of Youlus's unsubstantiated assertion that they were rescued from Holocaust-related sites. Similar questions were reported in an April 14, 2010 New York Times article concerning a Torah at New York's Central Synagogue.

On August 24, 2011, Youlus was arrested and charged with fraud. According to prosecutors, he made up the stories about the Torahs' origins. Youlus was also accused of taking more than $340,000 of the $1.2 million raised by Save a Torah, including $145,000 or more for his personal use. Through an attorney, Youlus initially denied the allegations. He later pleaded guilty to fraud, having used money from the fraud to cover his personal expenses.

== Complaint ==
Youlus was arrested in Manhattan on fraud charges on August 24, 2011, for claiming to have toured Europe in search of lost or hidden Torah scrolls – the holy Jewish texts containing Hebrew scripture. He distributed the scrolls among American synagogues and communities, sometimes at inflated rates, and diverted almost one third of $1.2 million into his accounts for personal use.

Youlus embezzled more than a million dollars from Save a Torah. He had that money transferred to a Jewish bookstore he co-owned in Wheaton, on a pretext of payment for restoring old and damaged scrolls. He was charged for writing $344,000 in checks to himself from the bookstore account, $200,000 in personal expenses, and for using $90,000 to pay private school tuition fee for his kith and kin. He was also charged for $145,000, which donors had meant for saving a Torah and was instead diverted to his personal bank account.

=== Investigation ===
David M. Rubenstein, one of the founders of Carlyle Group, who had bought a Torah and donated it to Central Synagogue, sought the authenticity of scrolls by hiring Michael Berenbaum, a Holocaust historian and former director of the Holocaust Research Institute at the United States Holocaust Memorial Museum. Berenbaum said, "What I found is the claim for the origin of the Torah could not be verified."

Menachem Z. Rosensaft, an adjunct professor of law at Cornell University, vice president of the American Gathering of Jewish Holocaust Survivors and their Descendants, and general counsel of the World Jewish Congress, was skeptical about Youlus's claim of discovering an old Torah at Bergen-Belsen concentration camp, as his parents were liberated from that camp and the camp was burned down by British Army during World War II. On complaint lodged by Rosensaft, the State of Maryland began investigating Save a Torah. State officials found that Youlus' stories "may be misleading." Michael P. Schlein, investigator for the Office of the Secretary of State of Maryland, said that "we could probably or reasonably assume they could not be wholly accurate."

Additionally, despite Youlus's claims that he traveled through Europe "rescuing" Torah strolls, his passport records show that he never traveled to Europe.

== Confession and sentencing ==
Youlus offered this confession on February 2, 2012, to Manhattan Federal District Court judge Colleen McMahon:

Between 2004 and 2010, I falsely represented that I had personally obtained vintage Torah scrolls — in particular ways, in particular locations — in Europe and Israel. I know what I did was wrong, and I deeply regret my conduct.

He also pleaded guilty to mail fraud and wire fraud, admitting that he had used the United States Postal Service and email to further a scheme to solicit donations and siphon money claiming for restoration and preservation of Torah scrolls.

As part of his plea agreement, he was ordered to repay his victims $1.2 million. Youlus was freed on $100,000 bond until he was sentenced on October 10, 2012, by Judge Colleen McMahon to just over four years in prison, and was released from federal prison on August 26, 2016.

== Awards ==
In 2005 Youlus received the Peacemaker award from the Olender Foundation.
