= Adas Israel Congregation (Washington, D.C.) =

Synagogue in Washington, D.C., U.S.

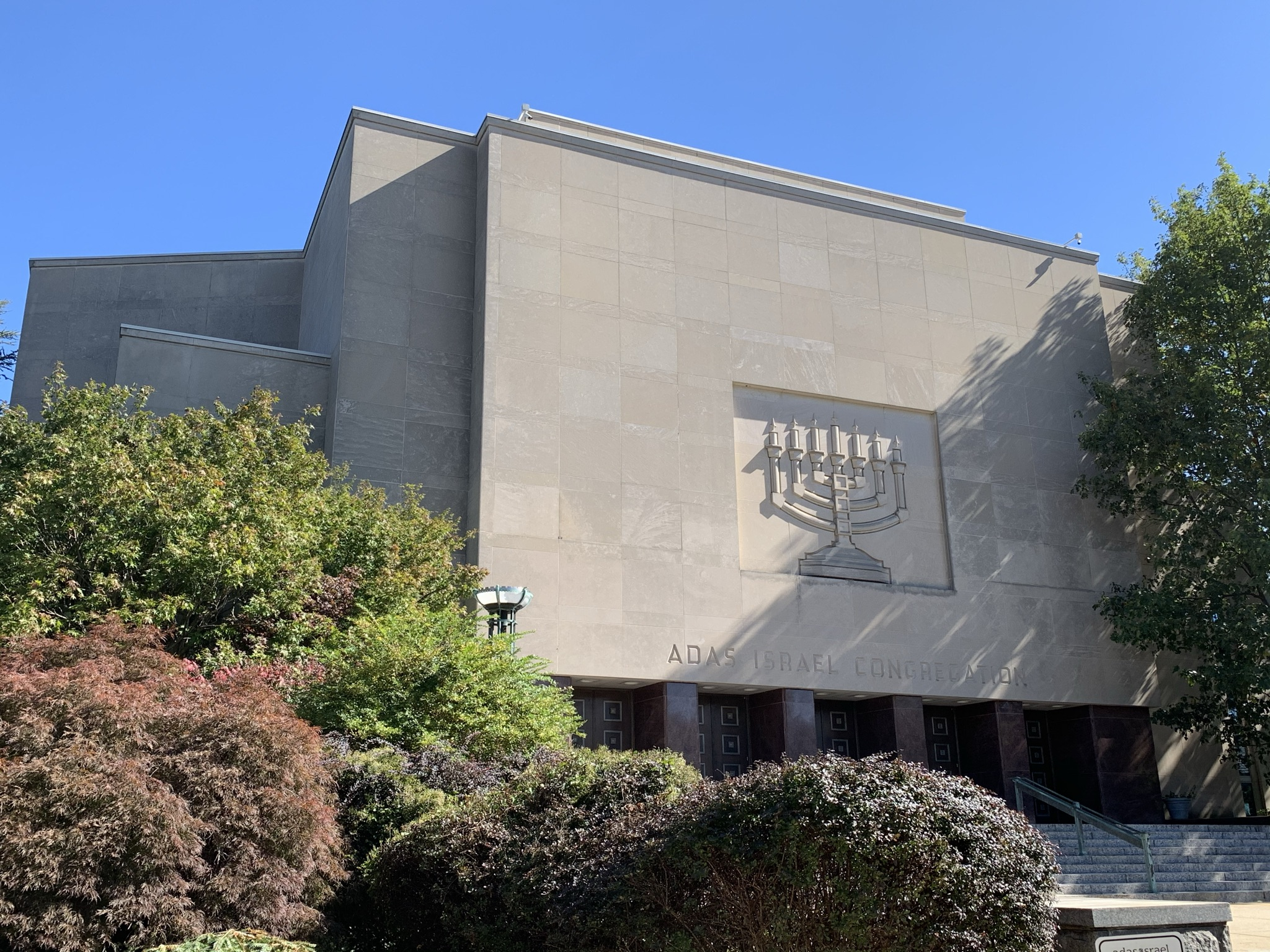
- The current Adas Israel synagogue

- Location within Washington, D.C.

Religion
- Affiliation: Conservative Judaism
- Ecclesiastical or organisational status: Synagogue
- Leadership: Rabbi Lauren Holtzblatt; Rabbi Aaron Alexander; Cantor Arianne Brown
- Status: Active

Location
- Location: 2850 Quebec Street NW, Washington, D.C.
- Country: United States
- Coordinates: 38°56′13″N 77°03′27″W

Architecture
- Architects: Louis Levi (1908); Frank Grad and Sons (1951)
- Type: Synagogue
- Established: 1876 (as a congregation)
- Completed: 1876 (1st building); 1908 (2nd building); 1951 (in current location)

Website
- www.adasisrael.org

The Adas Israel Congregation is a Conservative Jewish congregation which worships at the Adas Israel Synagogue, located in the Cleveland Park neighborhood of Washington, D.C. The name of the synagogue translates to "The Community of Israel" (Hebrew: ʿAdat Yisra’el, עדת ישראל).

== History ==
In 1869, about 30 Jewish immigrant families left the only Jewish congregation in Washington, D.C., Washington Hebrew Congregation (WHC), which practiced Reform Judaism. They formed an Orthodox synagogue, Adas Israel. Most of Adas Israel's founders came from various German and European states, especially Lithuania.

Adas Israel moved into a new building in 1908. In the late 1920s, Adas Israel affiliated with the Conservative movement and has remained a Conservative congregation since. In 1951, Adas Israel moved to another building and also discontinued its practice of providing separate seating for men and women in accordance with Orthodox tradition.

In 1963, Adas Israel was the first synagogue to be addressed by civil rights leader Dr. Martin Luther King Jr.

In 2013, the congregation opened the Dr. Avraham Biran Beit Midrash as part of a $15 million building renovation. The study hall combined a prayer area, wall-to-wall bookshelves, and small tables for shared Torah study with Wi-Fi and public programs intended to connect contemporary subjects with Jewish texts.

== Affinity groups and institutions ==
=== Cemetery ===
Adas Israel established a cemetery at 1400 Alabama Avenue, SE, in 1870.

=== Religious school ===
Adas Israel runs Gan HaYeled, a nursery school for children younger than five years old. The Melvin Gelman Religious School teaches students in grades K–12, with Ma'alot D.C., allowing teenagers to continue studying following their bar and bat mitzvahs.

=== Sisterhood ===
The Adas Israel Ladies’ Auxiliary, officially organized in 1898, elected Julia Oppenheimer, wife of congregation president Simon Oppenheimer, as their first president. Today the organization is known as the Sisterhood.

=== Brotherhood/Men’s Club ===
Adas Israel's Brotherhood first formed in 1941, with Irvin Goldstein serving as its first president. It later took the name Men's Club, which it holds today. Three Adas Israel members, Max Goldberg, Jacob Lish, and Mark Berlin, have served as national Men's Club presidents.

=== Other groups ===
Adas Israel held its first Chavurah (self-led) service in 1972, the first at any Conservative Jewish congregation. It also held its first self-led study group that year. Since then, Adas Israel has had a wide variety of lay-led groups, including the egalitarian minyan, Ruach Minyan, and groups for young professionals and senior citizens.

== See also ==
- List of synagogues in the United States
- Judaism in the United States
