= History of the Jews in Maryland =

Jews have settled in Maryland since the 17th century. As of 2018, Maryland's population was 3.9% Jewish at 201,600 people. The largest Jewish populations in Maryland are in Montgomery County, particularly Kemp Mill and Potomac, and the Baltimore metropolitan area, particularly Pikesville and northwest Baltimore. As of 2010, Baltimore and Baltimore County was home to a Jewish community of around 100,000 people. The Maryland suburbs of Washington, D.C. (Montgomery County and Prince George's County) have a Jewish population of around 116,700 as of 2017, with the majority residing in lower Montgomery County. The Rockville/Potomac area is the center of Montgomery County's Jewish population, while sizable communities also exist in the Bethesda/Chevy Chase area and in Silver Spring's Kemp Mill neighborhood. Smaller Jewish communities exist in Gaithersburg, Germantown, White Oak, Olney, and Takoma Park. Columbia, Frederick, Hagerstown, Annapolis, Cumberland, and Easton are also home to smaller but significant Jewish populations.

== History ==
=== 17th century ===
Because the Province of Maryland lacked major cities and the economy focused primarily around the tobacco industry, few Jews settled in Maryland for the first century and a half following the colony's founding in 1634.

Jacob Lumbrozo is the first known Jewish resident of Maryland, having settled in the Province of Maryland in 1656.

=== 19th century ===
Prior to 1826, Jews were prohibited from holding public office in Maryland. Maryland was one of the last states to have antisemitic laws prohibiting Jews from holding public office. On January 5, 1826, the Maryland General Assembly passed the Jew Bill repealing the prohibition.

The Jewish opinion of slavery in Maryland was divided. Some Jewish Marylanders owned slaves. Jewish Marylanders typically adopted the same values as their non-Jewish neighborhoods. In Southern Maryland, it was very rare for Jews to own slaves. In 1861, the Orthodox rabbi Bernard Illowy delivered a speech at the Lloyd Street Synagogue wherein he denounced the abolitionist movement and cited the Hebrew Bible to justify slavery. Due to the popularity of his speech, Jewish supporters of the Confederacy invited Rabbi Illowy to serve as the lead rabbi at Congregation Shaarei Chased in New Orleans. Rabbi David Einhorn, a Reform rabbi who served as leader of Har Sinai Congregation, was a vocal advocate for abolitionism, denouncing supporters of slavery within the Jewish community and arguing that the Bible could not condone slavery because all humans are made in the Image of God.

Between the 1830s and the 1870s, 10,000 German and Central European Jews settled in Maryland. Eastern European Jews began to settle in Maryland in the 1850s, with a mass emigration of Eastern European Jews occurring between the 1880s and the 1920s.

In 1899, 35,000 Jewish people lived in the state of Maryland.

=== 20th century ===
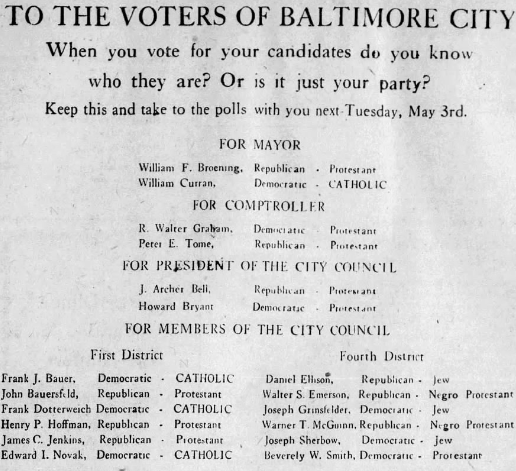
"To the Voters of Baltimore City", a 1927 announcement in the Baltimore Sun listing political candidates by race and religion: Jew, Catholic, Protestant, or Negro Protestant.

In 1904, Isidor Rayner was elected the first Jewish US Senator from Maryland, one of the first Jewish US Senators in American history.

In 1955, Kappa Guild, a charity run largely by Jewish women began raising funds to support children's health and welfare, providing medical equipment and resources to pediatric hospitals and programs across Maryland. In 1968, Winands Road Synagogue Center was established in Randallstown, Maryland. In 1969, Marvin Mandel became the first Jewish Governor of Maryland.

=== 21st century ===
In the 21st century, an increasing number of Jewish Marylanders (primarily in Montgomery County and the DC Metro Area) are Jews of color, including Black Jews, Asian Jews, Latino Jews, Indigenous Jews, and other non-white Jews. Sephardic Jews and Mizrahi Jews may or may not identify as Jews of color and may or may not be considered Jews of color by society. In 2017, 7% of Jewish adults in the Metro DC Jewish community identified as LGBT and 7% identified as Jews of color or Hispanic/Latino Jews (12,200 people). 9% of Jewish households in the region included a person of color, whether Jewish or non-Jewish. The majority of the DC region's Jews of color, three out of ten, live within Washington, D.C. In 2021, around 8,000 Jews of color lived in Baltimore, around 8% of the city's Jewish population. 39% of Jewish adults in the city identified as secular Jews or as "just Jewish", rather than belonging to a movement such as Reform, Conservative, Reconstructionist, or Orthodox. 21% of Baltimore's Jewish community was Orthodox. 10% of Jewish households included a member who identified as LGBT.

== Cuisine ==
The Chesapeake blue crab, an important aspect of Maryland's cuisine, is not kosher and is therefore not eaten by Jewish Marylanders who observe the laws of kashrut. Old Bay Seasoning, commonly used to season crab and shrimp, is certified kosher by the Orthodox Union. In 1939, a Jewish-German refugee from Nazi Germany named Gustav Brunn started the Baltimore Spice Company, which invented Old Bay seasoning.

== See also ==
- Antisemitism in Maryland
- History of the Jews in Baltimore
- History of the Jews in Cumberland, Maryland
- History of the Jews in Frederick, Maryland
- History of the Jews in Washington, D.C.
