= Randallstown, Maryland =

- Census-designated place
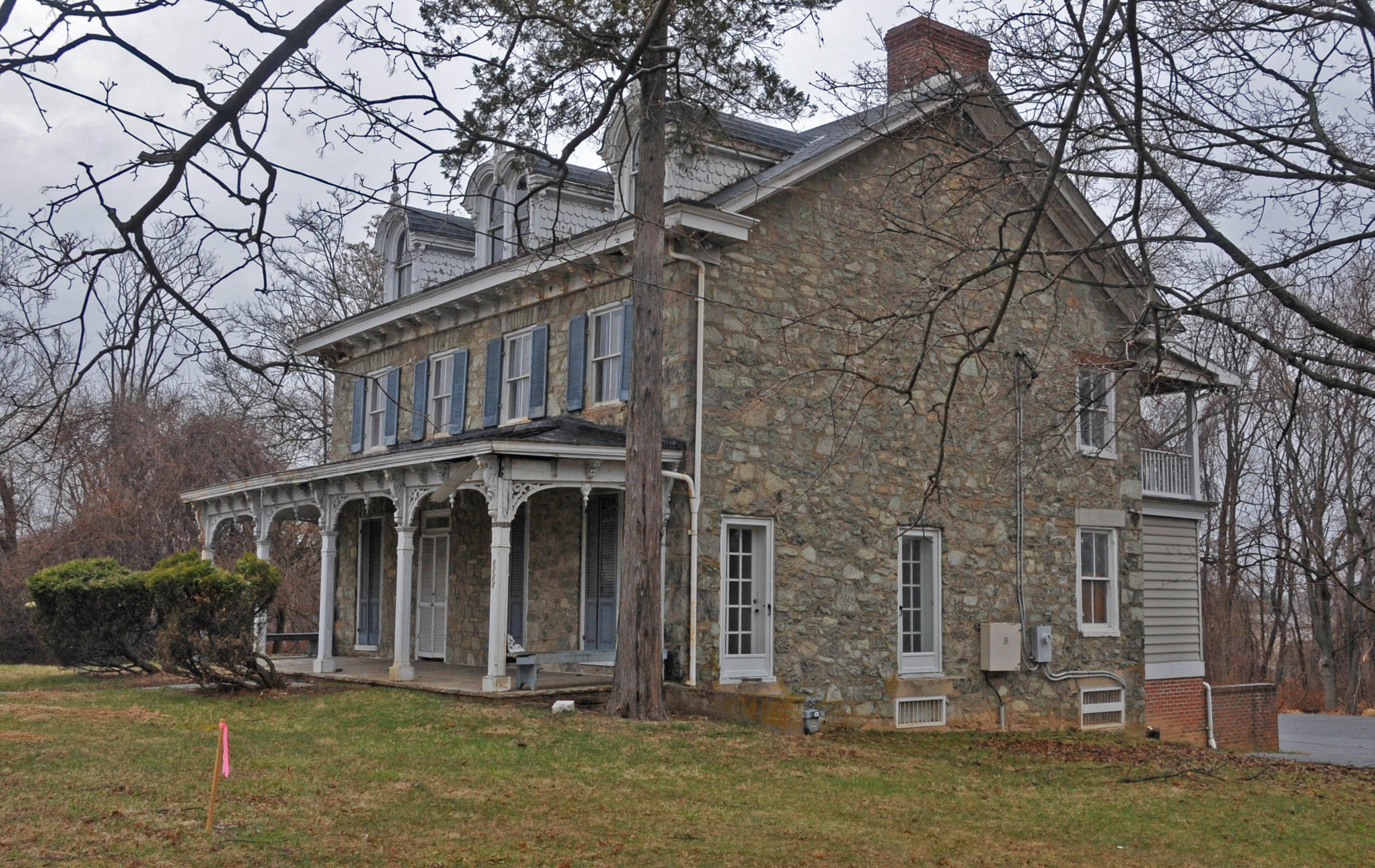
- Historic Choate House in Randallstown

- Location of Randallstown, Maryland
- Coordinates: 39°22′31″N 76°47′48″W
- Country: United States
- State: Maryland
- County: Baltimore

Area
  - Total: 10.24 sq mi (26.51 km^{2})
  - Land: 10.22 sq mi (26.48 km^{2})
  - Water: 0.015 sq mi (0.04 km^{2})
- Elevation: 584 ft (178 m)

Population (2020)
  - Total: 33,655
  - Density: 3,292/sq mi (1,271.2/km^{2})
- Time zone: UTC−5 (Eastern (EST))
  - Summer (DST): UTC−4 (EDT)
- ZIP code: 21133
- Area code: 410
- FIPS code: 24-64950
- GNIS feature ID: 2389725

Randallstown is an unincorporated community and census-designated place in Baltimore County, Maryland, United States. It is named after Christopher and Thomas Randall, two 18th-century tavern-keepers. At that time, Randallstown was a tollgate crossroads on the Liberty Turnpike, a major east–west thoroughfare. It is a suburb of Baltimore, with a population of 33,655 as of the 2020 census. In the 1990s, Randallstown transitioned to a majority African American community. As of 2020, it was 72 percent African American.

Choate House was listed on the National Register of Historic Places in 1989.

== Geography ==
Randallstown is located at 39°22′31″N 76°47′48″W (39.375272, −76.796621). According to the United States Census Bureau, the CDP has a total area of 10.3 square miles (27 km^{2}), all land.

== Demographics ==
Historical population
Census	Pop.	Note	%±
1970	33,683		—
1980	25,927		−23.0%
1990	26,277		1.3%
2000	30,870		17.5%
2010	32,430		5.1%
2020	33,655		3.8%
U.S. Decennial Census; 2010 2020

=== Racial and ethnic composition ===
Randallstown CDP, Maryland – Racial and ethnic composition Note: the US Census treats Hispanic/Latino as an ethnic category. This table excludes Latinos from the racial categories and assigns them to a separate category. Hispanics/Latinos may be of any race.
Race / Ethnicity (NH = Non-Hispanic)	Pop 2000	Pop 2010	Pop 2020	% 2000	% 2010	% 2020
White alone (NH)	7,017	4,160	3,253	22.73%	12.83%	9.67%
Black or African American alone (NH)	22,112	25,943	27,152	71.63%	80.00%	80.68%
Native American or Alaska Native alone (NH)	58	65	46	0.19%	0.20%	0.14%
Asian alone (NH)	682	651	658	2.21%	2.01%	1.96%
Native Hawaiian or Pacific Islander alone (NH)	5	12	8	0.02%	0.04%	0.02%
Other race alone (NH)	49	79	202	0.16%	0.24%	0.60%
Mixed race or Multiracial (NH)	471	643	1,123	1.53%	1.98%	3.34%
Hispanic or Latino (any race)	476	877	1,213	1.54%	2.70%	3.60%
Total	30,870	32,430	33,655	100.00%	100.00%	100.00%

=== 2020 census ===
As of the 2020 census, Randallstown had a population of 33,655. The median age was 43.6 years. 20.0% of residents were under the age of 18 and 20.2% of residents were 65 years of age or older. For every 100 females there were 83.1 males, and for every 100 females age 18 and over there were 78.3 males age 18 and over.

99.0% of residents lived in urban areas, while 1.0% lived in rural areas.

There were 12,645 households in Randallstown, of which 29.5% had children under the age of 18 living in them. Of all households, 41.1% were married-couple households, 15.7% were households with a male householder and no spouse or partner present, and 38.3% were households with a female householder and no spouse or partner present. About 27.1% of all households were made up of individuals and 12.6% had someone living alone who was 65 years of age or older.

There were 13,172 housing units, of which 4.0% were vacant. The homeowner vacancy rate was 1.6% and the rental vacancy rate was 5.6%.

Racial composition as of the 2020 census
Race	Number	Percent
White	3,353	10.0%
Black or African American	27,388	81.4%
American Indian and Alaska Native	79	0.2%
Asian	669	2.0%
Native Hawaiian and Other Pacific Islander	8	0.0%
Some other race	697	2.1%
Two or more races	1,461	4.3%

=== 2000 census ===
As of the census of 2000, there were 30,870 people, 11,379 households, and 8,147 families living in the CDP. The population density was 2,996.1 inhabitants per square mile (1,156.8/km^{2}). There were 11,900 housing units at an average density of 1,155.0 per square mile (445.9/km^{2}). The racial makeup of the CDP was 72.11% African American, 23.18% White, 0.20% Native American, 2.21% Asian, 0.02% Pacific Islander, 0.54% from other races, and 1.74% from two or more races. Hispanic or Latino of any race were 1.54% of the population. 6% of Randallstown's residents were Sub-Saharan African, 5% German, 3% African, 3% West Indian, 3% Irish, 2% Russian, 2% English, 2% Nigerian, 2% Polish, 2% Italian, and 2% Jamaican.

There were 11,379 households, out of which 34.3% had children under the age of 18 living with them, 50.0% were married couples living together, 17.6% had a female householder with no husband present, and 28.4% were non-families. 23.8% of all households were made up of individuals, and 7.4% had someone living alone who was 65 years of age or older. The average household size was 2.65 and the average family size was 3.13.

In the CDP, the population was spread out, with 26.3% under the age of 18, 7.0% from 18 to 24, 30.2% from 25 to 44, 24.8% from 45 to 64, and 11.6% who were 65 years of age or older. The median age was 37 years. For every 100 females, there were 84.1 males. For every 100 females age 18 and over, there were 79.0 males.

The median income for a household in the CDP was $55,686, and the median income for a family was $59,789. Males had a median income of $39,455 versus $36,020 for females. The per capita income for the CDP was $24,059. About 5.2% of families and 6.5% of the population were below the poverty line, including 5.9% of those under age 18 and 5.3% of those age 65 or over.

== History ==
Randallstown was founded in the 1700s by two brothers from England, Thomas and Christopher Randall. They introduced a tavern on Liberty Road serving travelers. In 1880, Randallstown had a population of 100. The Winands Road Synagogue Center was active from 1968 to 2019.

== Education ==
The area is served by Randallstown High School.

== Transportation ==
=== Roads ===
Some major roads in Randallstown are:

- Deer Park Road
- Liberty Road (MD-26)
- Marriottsville Road
- McDonogh Road
- Old Court Road
- Winands Road

=== Public transportation ===
While Randallstown was at one time the planned terminus for the Baltimore Metro Subway, the line was ultimately built to nearby Owings Mills. Though no stops on the line are actually in Randallstown, the three stops in Baltimore County are all within a close drive of the Randallstown area.

Bus service in Randallstown is available on the Maryland Transit Administration's bus routes 54 and 77. There is no bus link between Randallstown and nearby Carroll County, in part due to longstanding opposition to inter-county public transit from Carroll County officials and residents.

== Notable people ==
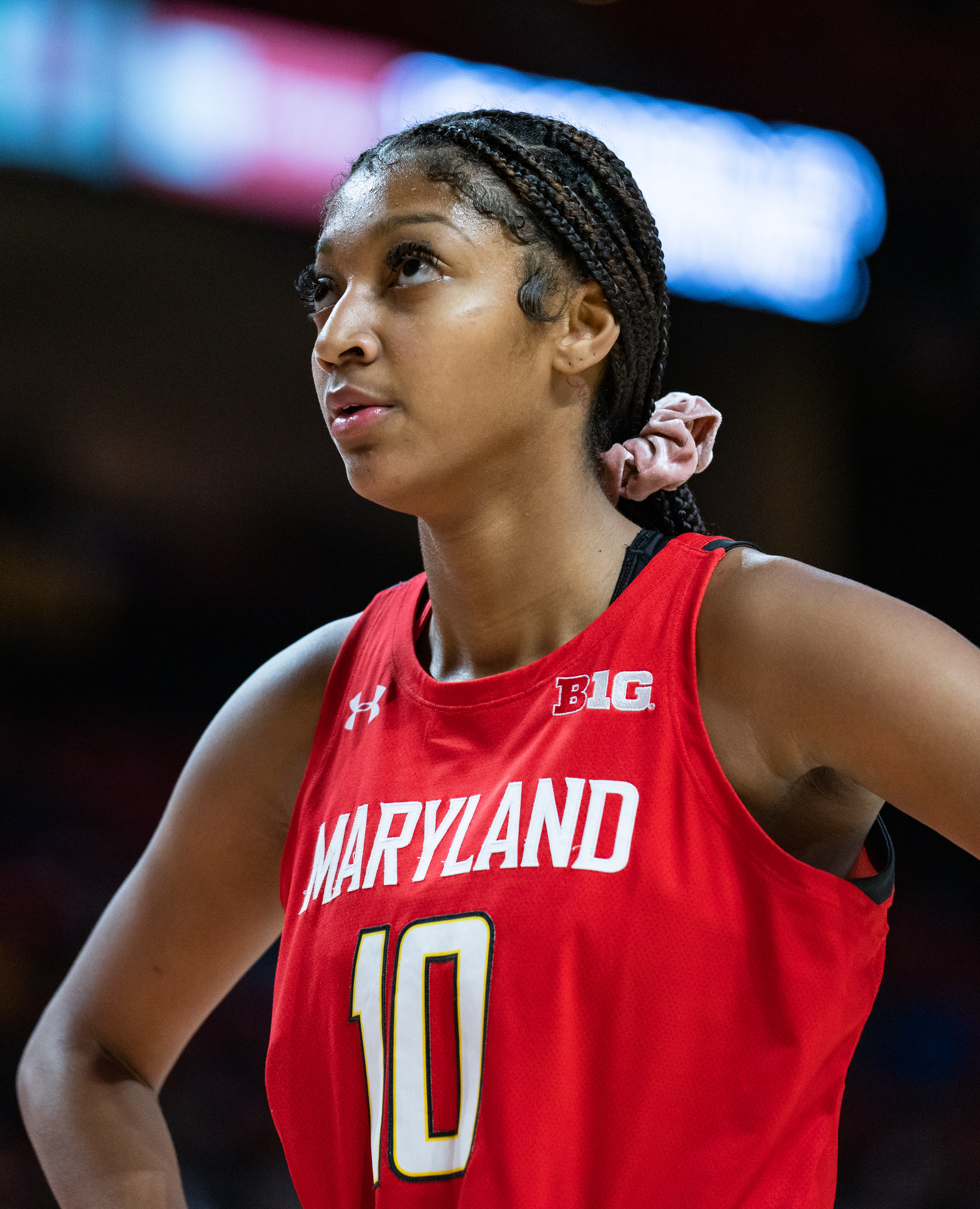
Angel Reese

- Christian Benford, National Football League player for the Buffalo Bills
- Christian B. Anfinsen, Nobel Prize laureate
- Victor Abiamiri, former NFL player for the Philadelphia Eagles, grew up in Randallstown
- Dennis Chambers, professional drummer
- Domonique Foxworth, former NFL cornerback and National Football League Players Association president, grew up in Randallstown
- Michele S. Jones, former Command Sergeant Major, Obama administration liaison
- Mario, R&B and pop singer
- Angel Reese, Louisiana State University and Atlanta Dream basketball player and Most Outstanding Player of the 2023 Women’s Final Four
- Sisqo, of the R&B group Dru Hill
