= Amalie Rothschild =

American painter

- Photo of Amalie Rothschild with two self-portraits (1984)
- Born: Amalie Getta Rosenfeld; January 1, 1916; Baltimore, Maryland
- Died: November 4, 2001 (aged 85); Pikesville, Maryland
- Resting place: Baltimore Hebrew Cemetery

Amalie Rothschild (January 1, 1916 – November 4, 2001) was an American artist who lived and worked within the art community of Baltimore, Maryland. A painter and sculptor, she was also an art teacher and philanthropist. She made oil and acrylic paintings as well as drawings, watercolors, and other paper works. She sculpted using found objects, Plexiglas, metals, and particleboard. Originally working in a realist style, she became known for geometric abstractions based on figurative subjects. In 1993, a critic described this approach as "[walking] a tightrope between the abstract and the representational with a suggestion of three-dimensional depth." Rothschild was by choice a regional artist. Although she occasionally exhibited elsewhere, she did not actively promote her career outside a mid-Atlantic region centered on Baltimore.

== Early life and training ==
Rothschild was born January 1, 1916, in Baltimore, Maryland. Her birth name was Amalie Getta Rosenfeld. Her parents were Eugene Isaac Rosenfeld (1884–1932) and Addye Goldsmith Rosenfeld (1887–1978), both born in Baltimore. Her father served in the Navy during the Spanish–American War having enlisted under the name Clarence Schneider. (Note: In her oral history interview Rothschild said, "He joined the navy. And in those days, for a Jewish boy to join the Navy was very unusual. And he didn't think the name Rosenfeld was going to go over very well in the Navy, so he took the name of Clarence -- oh, gosh -- all of a sudden I have a blank. [It was Schneider.]) Trained as an electrician while in the Navy, he subsequently founded and ran a Baltimore business called Eugene I. Rosenfeld & Co., electrical suppliers and contractors and still later owned a local automobile dealership. Rothschild had two brothers, Eugene Jr. and Edwin. Eugene Jr., after his father's death in 1932 took over the car dealership, and also owned two racehorses which he ran on tracks on the east coast. Once grown, Edwin changed his surname to Rogers and became a well-known Baltimore used car dealer. The Rosenfeld family belonged to a Reform congregation, Har Sinai.

In her youth, Rothschild attended a mix of public and private elementary schools. From age six to fifteen she took classes at the Maryland Institute. She attended an accelerated public junior high called School 49 and then Western High School in Baltimore. (Note: School 49, formally known as the Robert E. Lee Accelerate Junior High School, gave a rigorous academic education to boys and girls who had been selected from among all of Baltimore's elementary schools. Its curriculum compressed the normal three years of junior high into just two. It opened in 1909, using a building that had housed a private prep school, and closed in 1960.) (Note: Founded in 1844, and considered to be the first all-girls public high school in the United States, Western High School maintained selection criteria and high academic standards similar to those of School 49.) Having graduated at age 16 in 1932, Rothschild initially joined the freshman class at Goucher College, but changed her mind and began study at the Maryland Institute for the Mechanical Arts, now known as the Maryland Institute College of Art. Her parents cautioned her against majoring in a subject, such as fine arts, where graduates' job prospects were practically nil. She chose fashion illustration and, after graduating two years later, in 1935 she spent half a year at the Parsons School of Design (then called the New York School of Fine and Applied Art). She was offered a scholarship to study in Paris, France for 6 months, but her widowed mother forbid her to go abroad, so she returned to Baltimore and began to freelance as an illustrator, making drawings for department store ads. Starting in 1937 she took private instruction from local artist Richard Dicus and showed her work to Baltimore artist, Herman Maril.

== Career ==
Rothschild had a few small landscape oil paintings accepted for the seventh annual exhibition of Maryland painters, a juried show held in 1939 at the Baltimore Museum of Art. (Note: Known as the "All Maryland Show" these annual shows began in 1933 and twenty years later were expanded to include artists from Delaware and Washington, D.C. The shows became biennial and in the 1980s.) Three years later, her first appearance in a solo exhibition was also at the Baltimore Museum of Art. Early in the 1940s, she showed in the annual Christmas sales exhibition held at the Phillips Collection in Washington, D.C. and the museum's founder, Duncan Phillips, bought her painting "Slum Clearance" for the collection. In 1951, she was commissioned to design a curtain for the Torah ark in the newly built synagogue of the Baltimore Hebrew Congregation. In 1957, the Corcoran Gallery of Art bought her painting, "Penelope", which had been awarded a prize in the 12th Annual Area Exhibition, and in 1959 included her work along with works by Washington artists Anne E. Baum and Helene Herzbrun in a three-person exhibition.

In 1958, she began showing in commercial galleries, first in a group exhibition at the IFA Galleries in Washington and then, in the 1960s, in group shows at the Juster Gallery in Manhattan and the Rumsey Gallery (Rumsey Island, Maryland, 1966). In the 1970s and 1980s her work appeared in solo exhibitions in commercial galleries, including Jacob's Ladder (Washington, 1972), B.R. Kornblatt (Baltimore, 1978, 1980), C. Grimaldis (Washington, 1985, 1988, 1991, 1999), and Franz Bader (Washington, 1989, 1991). Her gallery during the last decade of her life was Gomez (Baltimore).

Beginning in the 1960s, she was given an increasing number of solo exhibitions in the museums and public galleries of the Baltimore area, including shows at Goucher College (1964, 1968), the Baltimore Museum of Art (1971), and the Maryland Institute of Art (1985). Her first major retrospective exhibition covering 50 years from 1933 to 1983 was held in 1984 at the Academy of Arts (Easton, Maryland) and her last retrospective was at Maryland Art Place in 1997. In 1986, she created two unusual cello case sculptures in the shape of women. The pair contained loudspeakers and were used in a piece of music performed by Baltimore composer Vivian Adelberg Rudow. Rothschild made a decision to remain a regional artist and did not seek to establish a national reputation.

After the birth of her children, she had constant household help. In general, "she had the freedom and opportunity to invest time into her art and advocate for artists." A few months before she died, an oral historian, Jean Freedman, interviewed Rothschild for the Jewish Women's Archive. Asked about her experience as an artist and a woman, she said, "Well, you know, I’ve been asked that question as an artist, 'How does it feel to be a woman artist? Have you felt discriminated against?' And I say, 'Well, not that I’m aware of.' I’ve been lucky, my art has prospered, and when I’ve applied to galleries I’ve frequently been accepted."

=== Artistic style ===
Amalie Rothschild, Resortscape, oil on canvas, 18 x 24 inches

Amalie Rothschild, Ripening of the Oranges, Sicily, acrylic on canvas, 48 x 48 inches

Amalie Rothschild, Birth of a Mermaid

Amalie Rothschild, Josepha, cast handmade paper on linen

Amalie Rothschild, Art Quotes, pen and ink on paper 16 x 7 inches

During the Jewish Women's Archive oral history interview, Rothschild said that she her style gradually evolved from realist to abstract during the 1940s and early 1950s. She made the change on her own in a slow self-taught process. In viewing a retrospective exhibition of her work, a critic said in 2012 that Rothschild's 1948 oil painting "Portrait of Me (Self Portrait with Crossed Arms)" seemed to be a transitional work, particularly as it emphasized Rothschild's angular shoulders and arms. In the interview, she also said her experience as a volunteer art therapist in the 1950s helped her to move away from planned and structured work and to move toward a more spontaneous expression of emotion. In 1958, a gallerist described the paintings in her emerging geometric style as "personal abstract statements characterized by subtlety of color, symbol, and pattern." Her interest in the human figure persisted even as what was seen as her "distinctive take on geometric abstraction" evolved, and many of her paintings contain elements that derive from parts of the body as seen from unusual angles. The 1968 acrylic painting "Ripening of the Oranges, Sicily" (shown at left) is said to be a first-rate example of how she relied upon a "gridded composition that allowed for both structural variation and representational allusion."

During the 1960s, Rothschild made a transition from painting to sculpture. She took evening sculpture classes at the Baltimore Museum of Art and began to make assemblages using found objects, including pieces of wood that she arranged to have cast in bronze at a foundry in Pennsylvania. She gradually expanded the scope of her sculptural work to include a wide variety of materials including found objects, Plexiglas, metals, and particleboard. She usually made her sculptures by herself, without outside help. In size they range from large outdoor and sometimes monumental pieces to small works that can be held in the hand.

In the early 1980s, Rothschild learned paper-making at the Pyramid Atlantic Art Center in Hyattsville, Maryland. She used this new skill to make what one critic called "highly embossed sculptural works." (Note: Helen C. Frederick founded Pyramid Atlantic as a non-profit contemporary art center providing instruction and studio rentals for paper makers, print makers, and book arts craftspeople.)

In 1993 she contrasted two aspects of her method, one, called "material to idea," in which she created sculptures with found materials, and the other, "idea to material," in which she started with a drawing and then assembled the material to create the final product.

During the years in which sculpture dominated her output she continued to make quick and spontaneous works on paper, both drawings and watercolors. One of these drawings, "Art Quotes" (1966) can bee seen at right. Shortly before her death she made a return to figuration in a set of small works on paper prepared for a solo exhibition at the C.Grimaldis Gallery called "Artist and Model." A critic said that in these works (in ink, watercolor, and oil) she explored how the models the artists depicted could be "reduced to their definitional lines," showing them as compositional elements rather than living beings.

When in 1997 a critic reviewed the whole body of her output he commented on her stylistic consistency. He wrote, "A group of Baltimore artist Amalie Rothschild's sculptures and drawings demonstrate the consistency of this artist's work: its sure craftsmanship, its sly humor and its debt to the superficially childlike but deeply wise work of Paul Klee." Throughout her career she was similarly consistent in her work habits. In 2012, broadcast journalist Sheila Kast said Rothschild was "one of Baltimore’s most prolific visual artists during the 20th century."

Rothschild said that Matisse's practice of what she called "automatic drawings" helped her to achieve greater self-expressiveness. She said her earlier work had not successfully conveyed her inner feelings and that she had gradually changed her style to make it more expressive. A critic who reviewed a retrospective exhibition of her work at the Gomez Gallery saw her "singular devotion to her vision of abstractions based on geometric forms" as overly formal. "Her work is pleasing, disciplined, often clever," he wrote, "but not amply challenging," adding that there he saw too little sense of struggle or pushing of boundaries. Some years later, the same critic said her work had "emotional reserve," but did not then see this characteristic as a flaw. He wrote, "Her work is thoroughly modern and related to geometric abstraction, but without losing the figure. It has emotional reserve, often contains a hint of humor and at times recalls the childlike sagacity of the great Paul Klee."

== Teaching ==
Between 1956 and 1970, Rothschild volunteered as an art therapist at the Springfield State Mental Hospital where she and her artist friend Cecile Baer gave what she called "kindergarten level" instruction to severely disabled adults. Her goal was not so much to teach them art as to help them to express themselves in some way through paint and paper. During the next four years, she taught at a small school that had been established to offer an alternative to what the organizers saw as the extreme conservatism of the Maryland Institute of Art. Called the Metropolitan School of Art, it folded when the Maryland Institute brought in a new director and changed its policies. One of her fellow instructors, Gladys Goldstein, later became a Baltimore abstract painter. Beginning in 1960, Rothschild spent eight years as a part-time instructor at Goucher College. She taught students painting and drawing in one course each semester and resigned when asked to work full-time.

== Philanthropy ==
Between 1948 and 1950, she was president of the city's Artists' Union. (Note: Local artists formed the union in 1934 to promote their work and make it available to purchasers.) In 1952, she initiated the idea and helped to found the Baltimore Outdoor Art Festival which was subsequently held for nearly a quarter of a century in Druid Hill Park. In the late 1950s, she chaired the artists committee of the Baltimore Museum of Art and helped to found an artists' cooperative called Gallery One. During the 1960s she pulled back from commitments such as these and for the rest of her life was somewhat more selective in the leadership roles she chose to take. In 2001, she commented on this change: "I’ve been on every committee imaginable...and always was a leader in all these various things when I was younger. And finally I got to the point of where I wasn’t having enough time to do my own work, I was always on the telephone. And I started to say no to everything. And after a while I became isolated, and I said, 'Oh, this won’t do either.' So then gradually I started saying yes again. I try to reach a happy medium of being involved in the city."

In the late 1970s and early 1980s, she was on the board of trustees, first of the Baltimore Museum of Art, then of Maryland Art Place, and finally of the Maryland Institute, her alma mater, until she resigned 3 days before her death. In 1993, the State Arts Council and Maryland Citizens for the Arts organization gave Rothschild and her husband a Maryland Medici Award for their major contributions to the arts (his in music, hers in fine art). (Note: The Medici Award was given annually to a person, business, or foundation that made major contributions to arts in the state.) In 2000, recognizing her many years of service to the arts community, the State of Maryland made her the second recipient of the Maryland Arts Lifetime Achievement Award.

== Personal life ==
In 1936 Rothschild married Randolph Schamberg Rothschild (1909–2003) in New Hampshire where his parents were summering. He was a lawyer who worked in a business owned by his family, the Sun Life Insurance Co. At the time of his retirement in 1972 he was the company's vice president and general counsel. He was also an amateur jazz pianist and from 1951 to 1997 ran the Chamber Music Society of Baltimore. His obituary called him "a champion of modern composers for the past five decades" and "a major benefactor of the Baltimore Symphony Orchestra, the Peabody Conservatory and the old Chamber Music Society of Baltimore."

The couple had two children, Amalie (born 1945) and Adrien (born 1949). Amalie is a filmmaker and photographer and Adrien is a textile artist specializing in quilts. (Note: In the 2001 oral history interview by the Jewish Women's Archive, Rothschild said Adrien was not making quilts at that time. She described her daughter as a: "designer and maker of quilts. She does every single stitch by hand. And she did that for quite a number of years, and she's in the collection of the White House, the craft collection of the White House. She won awards almost every place she exhibits in. And she's been written up in all the quilt magazines and one thing and another. And she was invited to do a Christmas ornament for the White House Christmas tree, and all that sort of thing. And that's what she was doing. And it's very demanding and tedious work.") In 2001, Rothschild said of her role as both mother and professional artist, "A lot of the artists go into Baltimore and rent big spaces. But I never wanted to be away from home, because I was always home when my children were little. They came home and a mom was always home. And I would be an artist most of the time. When they were home on vacation, I said, “I’m not an artist now, I’m a mom.” And so that's the way it went all those years."

Rothschild died at her home in Pikesville, Maryland, November 4, 2001.
