= Shearith Israel =

Shearith Israel or Sherith Israel (Hebrew: שארית ישראל "Remnant of Israel"), may refer to the following Jewish synagogues:

== Canada ==
- Spanish and Portuguese Synagogue of Montreal, a Sephardic-Orthodox synagogue, also known as Shearith Israel

== United States ==
- Congregation Shearith Israel, a Sephardic-Orthodox synagogue, often called The Spanish and Portuguese Synagogue, in New York City.
- Congregation Shearith Israel (Baltimore, Maryland), a historic (1851) congregation in Baltimore founded by Abraham Rice, the first ordained rabbi in the United States.
- Congregation Shearith Israel (Wharton, Texas), a defunct synagogue
- Congregation Sherith Israel (Nashville, Tennessee), an Orthodox synagogue
- Congregation Sherith Israel (San Francisco, California), a Reform synagogue
- Sherith Israel Temple (Cincinnati, Ohio), an historic building previously used as a synagogue
