= Yuriko Yamaguchi =

Yuriko Yamaguchi is the name of:

- Yuriko Yamaguchi (voice actress) (born 1965), Japanese voice actor
- Yuriko Yamaguchi (sculptor) (born 1948), Japanese artist
