= Florence E. Bamberger =

American educator and writer (1882-1965)

- Born: Florence Eilau Bamberger; October 19, 1882; Baltimore, Maryland
- Died: December 18, 1965 (aged 83); Baltimore, Maryland
- Occupations: Professor of education Director of College for Teachers

Academic background
- Education: B.S. (1914), M.A. (1915), PhD (1922), Columbia Teachers College
- Influences: John Dewey

Academic work
- Discipline: Education
- Sub-discipline: Progressive education, teacher training
- Institutions: Johns Hopkins University
- Notable works: The Effect of the Physical Make-Up of the Book Upon Children's Selections (1922)

Florence Eilau Bamberger (October 19, 1882 – December 18, 1965) was an American pedagogue, school supervisor, progressive education advocate, and author. Influenced by the ideas of John Dewey, she researched, lectured, and wrote extensively on the concept of child-centered education. She spent most of her career as a professor of education in the department of philosophy at Johns Hopkins University, and was the first woman to attain a full professorship at that university. From 1937 to 1947 she served as director of Johns Hopkins' College for Teachers. After her retirement, she taught in private elementary schools in Baltimore, Maryland.

== Early life and education ==
Bamberger was born on October 19, 1882, in Baltimore, Maryland. Her parents were Ansel Bamberger and his wife Hannah (née Eilau), a Jewish family. She graduated from Western High School and pursued studies at Cornell University, Johns Hopkins University, the University of Chicago, and Columbia Teachers College. She received all her degrees from Columbia Teachers College: a BS in 1914, an MA in 1915, and a PhD in education in 1922.

== Career ==
Bamberger started her career in the Baltimore public school system in the early twentieth century, being an assistant supervisor of practice work for the city board of education. By 1914 she was supervisor of practice teaching, making her the first woman school supervisor in Baltimore.

In 1916 she became an instructor in education in the department of philosophy at Johns Hopkins University. She was promoted to associate instructor in 1917, associate professor in 1920, and full professor of education in 1924. She was the first woman to attain a full professorship at the university. As an advisor for graduate students at Johns Hopkins, she supervised Ira Beaty, father of actor Warren Beatty, who was pursuing his graduate degree in education in 1928.

During the summers, she taught pedagogy at the University of Pennsylvania (1914–1922) and the University of Chicago (1927–1929).

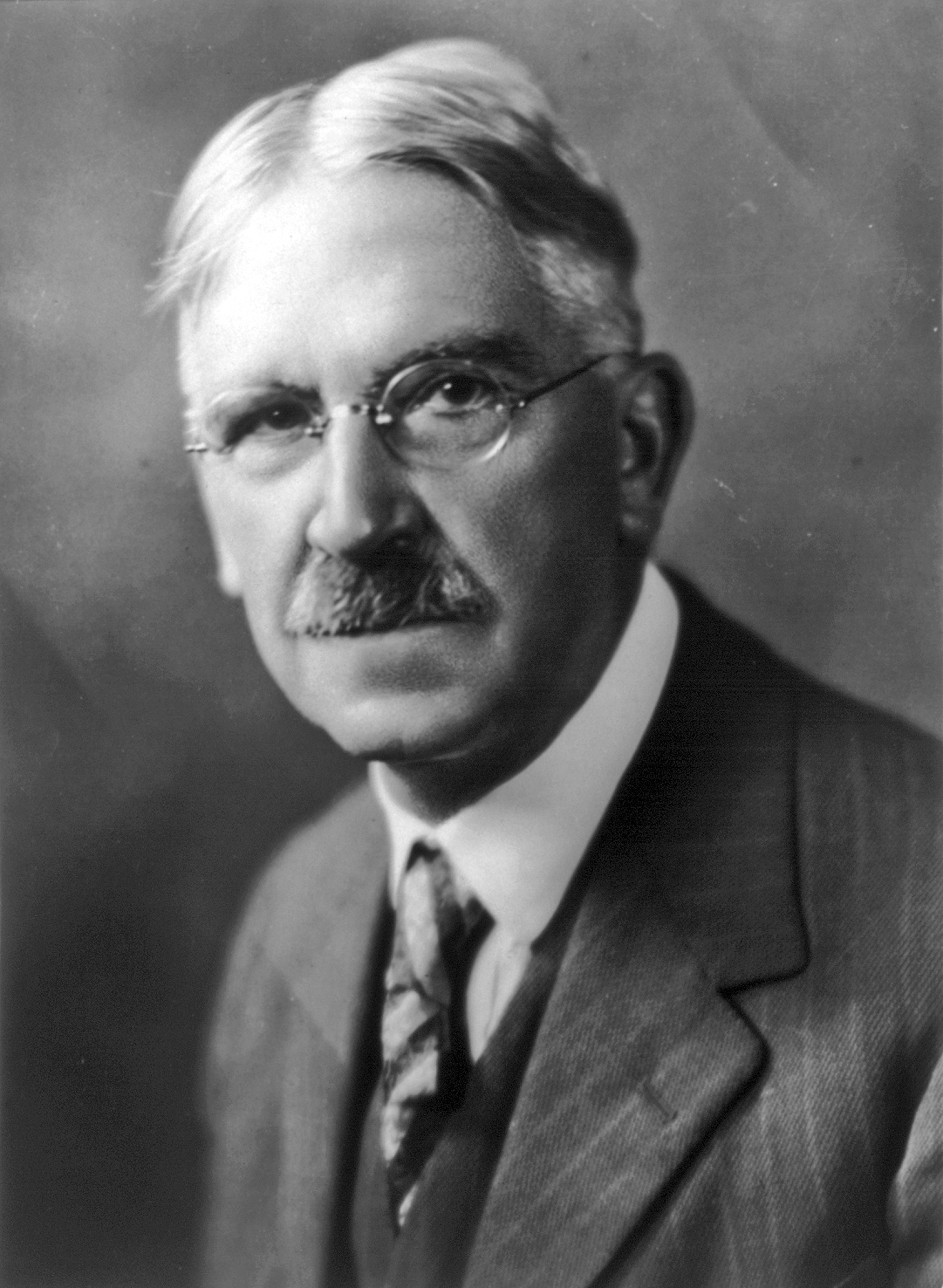
John Dewey

Bamberger was strongly influenced by the ideas of American educational reformer John Dewey, under whom she studied at Columbia University. In her teaching and research, she advanced the concept of child-centered education. She encouraged teachers to connect the child's interests to the classwork.

She is considered the first to address the importance of book design and layout for stimulating the child's interest in reading, with her 1922 monograph The Effect of the Physical Make-Up of a Book Upon Children's Selection, published in the Johns Hopkins University Studies in Education series. This monograph describes an in-class experiment with children from five different schools. The teacher started reading a story to the children – the stories were Cinderella, Sleeping Beauty, Black Sambo, Peter Rabbit, and The Night Before Christmas – and stopped "at an interesting point". The children were then shown five different published editions of the story and were asked which book the teacher should read from to finish the story, based both on the external look of the volume and the inside contents. Through this experiment Bamberger quantified "the effects of size, bindings, illustrations, etc." on stimulating children's interest, and also differentiated the results by gender and grade level. Her findings included:

Size appears to be a factor in book selection. ... The size most acceptable to the children in the primary grades appears to be about seven and one-half inches long by five inches wide and one inch thick. ... Twenty-five percent of the book space seems the minimum amount of space to be devoted to pictures to make a book acceptable for little children. Large, full-page pictures are preferred to smaller ones inserted irregularly in the text. ... Colors preferred by the younger children are rather crude and elementary, having a high degree of saturation and a great deal of brightness. Older children gradually grow into a preference for softer tints and tones.

Bamberger's 1931 book Guide to Children's Literature, co-authored with Angela M. Broening, asserted that science would appeal to children more if textbooks were "artistically presented".

== Other activities ==
Bamberger lectured on parental education under the auspices of the Child Study Association of America.

She served as executive secretary of Johns Hopkins' College for Teachers executive committee (1930–1937), and was named director of the College for Teachers in 1937.

Following her retirement from Johns Hopkins in 1947, she taught at several private elementary schools in the Baltimore area, including the Homewood School, and was principal of the secular studies division at the Talmudical Academy of Baltimore. She also developed teacher-training curricula. One of the methodologies that she promoted was the placement of mentors in the classroom to supervise and comment on a teacher's pedagogical skills. Additionally, she was a consultant to publishers of children's books. From 1949 to 1953 she was a visiting professor in education at the University of Florida.

== Memberships ==
Bamberger was a member of the National Education Association, the National Society for Study of Education, the National Society of College Teachers of Education, the Baltimore Educational Society, the American Academy of Political and Social Science, the American Association of University Women, the International Peace Council, and the Baltimore League of Women Voters. She chaired the board of trustees of the William Deiches Fund, which provided scholarships for public school students in Baltimore.

== Honors ==
Bamberger was listed in the 1933 Who's Who in American Jewry, the 1936 Principal Women of America, the 1939 International Blue Book, and the 1946 Who's Who in American Education, among others.

== Personal life ==
She died on December 18, 1965, in Baltimore.

== Selected bibliography ==
- Syllabus Guide for Observation of Demonstration Lessons. 1938.
- Reading: A Form of Living. 1938.
- Guide to Children's Literature. 1931. (with Angela M. Broening)
- The Effect of the Physical Make-Up of a Book Upon Children's Selection. Baltimore, The Johns Hopkins press. 1922.

=== Journal articles ===
- Bamberger, Florence E (1932). "The Mistake of Child Controlled Schools and Homes". Childhood Education. 8 (8): 400–403. doi:10.1080/00094056.1932.10727563.
- Bamberger, Florence E. (March 1929). "The Problem of Individualization: Safety and danger points in individualized instruction in elementary school English". The Elementary English Review. 6 (3): 84–87. JSTOR 41381703.
- Bamberger, Florence E. (1929). "The Supervisor in Relation to the Teacher—Health". American Physical Education Review. 34 (4): 212–213. doi:10.1080/23267224.1929.10652118.
- Bamberger, Florence Eilau (1928). "Teachers' Problems as a Basis of Supervision". Childhood Education. 5 (2): 111–112. doi:10.1080/00094056.1928.10723394.
- Bamberger, Florence E. (1927). "Active Youth". Childhood Education. 3 (8): 360–362. doi:10.1080/23267224.1929.10652118.
- Bamberger, Florence E (November 1927). "A Survey of Observable, Improvable Factors Which Evidence Skill in Teaching". The Elementary School Journal. 28 (3): 181ff. doi:10.1086/456030. S2CID 143919590.
- Bamberger, Florence E (October 1926). "Supervision: Shared Responsibility". The Elementary School Journal. 27 (2): 113ff. doi:10.1086/461968. S2CID 145669123.
- "Progressive Education in Public Schools" (PDF). Educational Review. 61: 19–32. 1921.
- "Progressive Education and Character Building" (PDF). Progressive Education Association. December 1920.

== Sources ==
- Buswell, G.T. (1922). "Review: The Effect of the Physical Make-up of a Book upon Children's Selection by Florence Eilau Bamberger". The Elementary School Journal. 22 (9): 713–714. doi:10.1086/455239. JSTOR 995700.
- Chamber of Commerce of Metropolitan Baltimore (1911). Annual Report.
- Cook, Robert Cecil, ed. (1946). Who's Who in American Education: A Biographical Dictionary of Eminent Living Educators of the United States. Vol. 12. Who’s Who in American Education.
- Finstad, Suzanne (2005). Warren Beatty: A Private Man. Crown/Archetype. ISBN 978-0307338167.
- Jacob, Kathryn Allamong (1977), "Florence Eilau Bamberger, 1882–1965: Suffragette and Educator", in Helmes, Winifred Gertrude (ed.), Notable Maryland Women, Tidewater Publishers, ISBN 9780870332364
- Luckett, Margie Hersh (1931). Maryland Women: Baltimore, Maryland, 1931–1942. Vol. 1. King Bros. Inc. Press.
- Marcus, Jacob Rader (1981). The American Jewish Woman, 1654–1980. KTAV Publishing House. ISBN 978-0870687518.
- Principal Women of America. Vol. 2. Mitre Press. 1936.
- Pellowski, Anne (1980). Made to Measure: Children's books in developing countries. UNESCO. ISBN 978-92-3-101783-4.
- Ringrose, Hyacinthe, ed. (1939). The International Blue Book: Who's Who in the World. Hyacinthe Ringrose.
- Schwartz, Julius; Kaye, Solomon Aaron; Simons, John (1933). Who's Who in American Jewry. Jewish Biographical Bureau.
- "The University Record of the University of Florida". University of Florida. 1 March 1952. p. 11.
- Williams, Alice Marietta (1939). Children's choices in science books: A study to discover some elements of a book in the field of science that appeal to children. Teachers College, Columbia University.
