= Western High School (Maryland) =

Public school in Baltimore, Maryland, United States

Location
- 4600 Falls Road at West Cold Spring Lane; Baltimore, Maryland 21209; United States; 39°20′54″N 76°38′37″W

Information
- School type: Public secondary magnet school
- Motto: "Lucem Accepimus, Lucem Demus" (Latin) ("We have received light; let us give forth light")
- Founded: November 1, 1844; 181 years ago
- Sister school: Baltimore Polytechnic Institute ("Poly")
- School district: Baltimore City Public Schools (BCPS)
- Superintendent: Sonja Santelises
- School number: 407
- Principal: Britney Horne
- Grades: 9–12
- Gender: Girls
- Enrollment: 1,089 (2014)
- Area: Urban
- Colors: Red and black
- Slogan: "Western, Only the Best!"
- Song: "Dear Western"
- Athletics conference: Maryland Public Secondary Schools Athletic Association (MPSSAA), Baltimore City League
- Mascot: "Dove"
- Team name: "The Doves"
- Website: www.baltimorecityschools.org/o/western
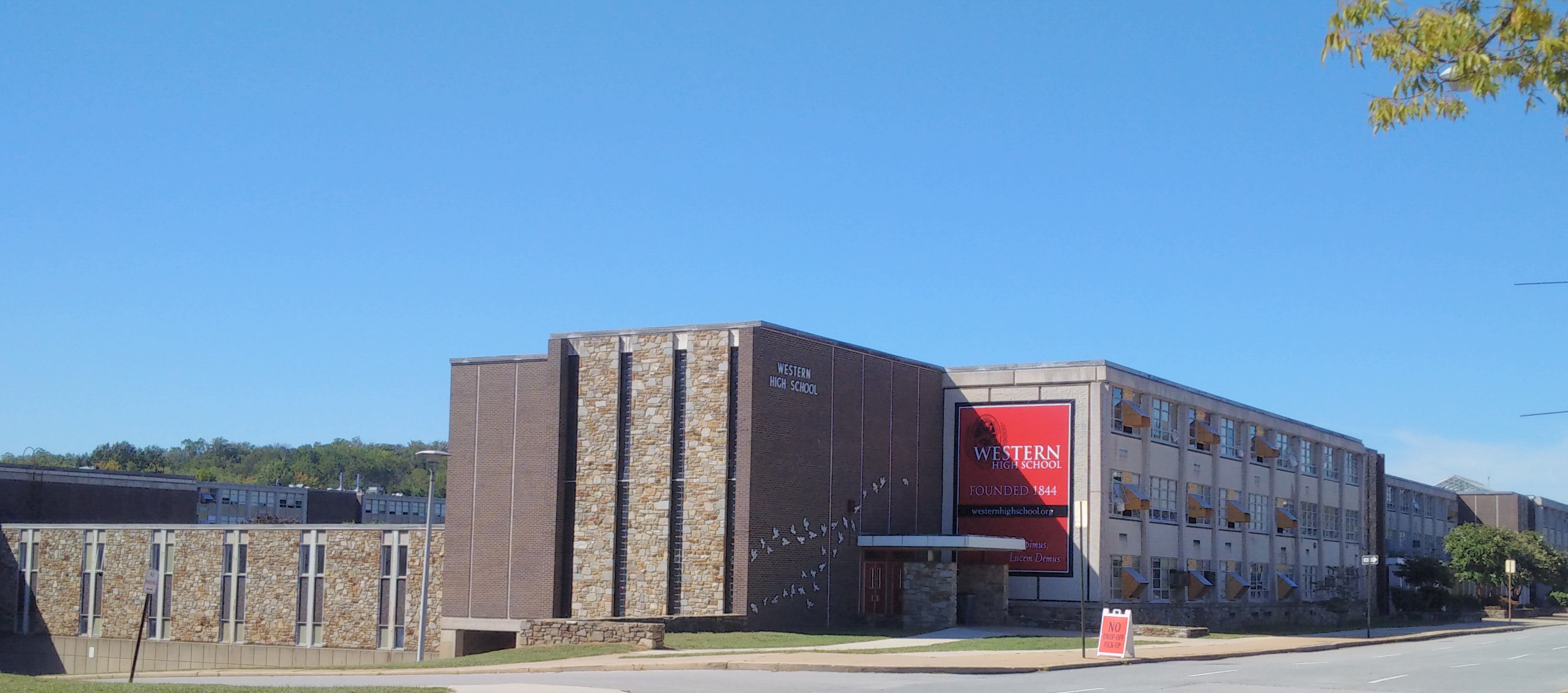

Western High School is the oldest public all-girls high school remaining in the United States. It is the third-oldest public high school in the state of Maryland and part of the Baltimore City Public Schools. Western High was named a "National Blue Ribbon School" of Excellence by the U.S. Department of Education in 2009 and a "Silver Medal High School" by the news magazine U.S. News & World Report in 2012.

== History ==
The Western Female High School was founded in 1844 as one of two "twin sisters" secondary schools for young ladies in the then 15-year-old Baltimore City Public Schools system, along with the Eastern Female High School. Earlier in 1829, the first four "grammar" schools (today's elementary schools) were established by the newly organized B.C.P.S., two for boys and two for girls, one in each of the four quadrants of the smaller densely populated city that was Baltimore then.

On November 1, 1844, the Western High School officially opened its doors for the first time in the old Armitage Hall located at 100 North Paca Street on the western side of downtown Baltimore, between West Fayette and Lexington Streets. In those two small rented rooms, Robert Kerr, the first principal and sole teacher, welcomed thirty-six young women. Thus began the unique legacy of Western, a pioneer in women's education, along with its companion Eastern High, in the United States. Before the two female high schools were established (as described in the literature of the day, two separate institutions were established in order not to pose an unusual hardship on the young ladies traveling distances through the town), there had been no opportunity for Baltimore girls to get an education beyond the grammar school level.

By 1896, a half-century later and several relocations later, W.F.H.S. moved to a new, more expensive building specifically constructed for the girls' high school on Lafayette and McCulloh Streets in the northwestern residential neighborhood of Upton. By this time, the girls had opportunities to take clerical courses.

After several other moves, in 1928 the school moved to twin H-shaped structure of red brick and limestone trim in an English Tudor / Elizabethan /Jacobethan architecture on Gwynns Falls Parkway, opposite financier George Brown's estate "Mondawmin" which was replaced by one of the earliest enclosed malls in 1956), which was the duplicate of a similar new building for sister Eastern High in 1938 on 33rd Street and Loch Raven Boulevard.

In 1954, the year of the racial integration of the Baltimore City Public Schools, the Gwynns Falls site became the home of Frederick Douglass High School, and WHS moved on again.

For the next thirteen years WHS was on the southwest corner of North Howard and West Centre Street in the former Baltimore City College building of 1895–1928, which had housed the Boys Vocational High School until 1954 when it merged with Samuel Gompers Vocational High School to form Mergenthaler Vocational-Technical High School in a new brick building and campus in 1955 on Hillen Road, facing Lake Montebello in the northeast city.

Western's years at the old City College building were crowded and difficult with an additional annex building and no surrounding campus in its near downtown and Mount Vernon-Belvedere neighborhood location.

Finally a new modern Western High finally opened in its current location at 4600 Falls Road at the northwest corner with West Cold Spring Lane (just east of the stream Jones Falls which divides the city) in September 1967, sharing a joint, huge, modern campus with the then all-male Baltimore Polytechnic Institute to the west, the city's premier mathematics/science/technology and engineering magnet public high school, previously founded 1883 on little Courtland Street as the Baltimore Manual Training School, and renamed a decade later. The new "Poly-Western Complex", on the drawing boards for five years, was one of the most expensive and largest high school campuses constructed in America up to that time.

For most of its history, Western has been a citywide "magnet program", officially designated as such in 1975. Students must apply and meet certain entrance criteria.

Baltimore Leadership School for Young Women (BLSYW), established in 2009, initially occupied the third floor of Western but moved into its own building in the former Young Women's Christian Association (YWCA downtown center at the northeast corner of Park Avenue and West Franklin Street in the following year. The people of Western High School opposed the idea of BLSYW being housed in that building.

The principal of Western High School in 2020 was Britney Horne.

== Academics ==
Western High offers three academic programs/curriculums: the "Accelerated College Preparatory" ("A Course"), "College Preparatory", and the "Teacher Academy". Western's most rigorous academic program is the "Advanced College Preparatory" Program, ("The 'A' Course"), which was established in 1933 by a joint agreement between Western and the then also all-female Goucher College (formerly located on the 2400 block of St. Paul Street in the Charles Village neighborhood in northern Baltimore City and relocated in the 1950s to the northeast of Towson, the county seat of suburban Baltimore County).

Within the "Accelerated College Preparatory" program, students can finish four years of high school work in grade 9–11. During their 12th-grade year they are able to pursue Advanced Placement or college-level courses. Students who graduate from "The 'A' Course" may enter college or university with "advanced standing". This rigorous college preparatory program allows students to take honors courses in subjects in which they demonstrate strength. The classes of 2003, 2004, 2005, 2006, 2007, 2008 and 2009 had a 100% four-year college acceptance rate. The W.H.S.'s "Teacher Academy" offers four classes that prepare students for a career in education. Western also annually produces championship athletic teams and prize-winning performing arts students and sponsors more than 40 different type of clubs, organizations, service groups and publications. In 2012, the news magazine U.S. News & World Report ranked Western High School as 912th nationally and 44th in Maryland as a "Silver Medal High School".

== Athletics ==
Western High school's athletics program (the Doves) fields teams in soccer, cross-country, badminton, swimming, lacrosse, dance, tennis, volleyball, basketball, softball and track and field. The Western Doves girls' basketball team won the Maryland public secondary school championships in 1994 and 1995. They were runners-up in the state contests in 1998, 1999, 2003, 2004, 2005, 2007 and 2010. They won 35 or more District IX Baltimore City Championships and have been to State Finals a record 14 times (the most in Maryland history). The Western track and field team are perennial champions, winning multiple city, regional and state championships. They won 29 Baltimore City Indoor/Outdoor Track Championships, 1995-2007(I) 1990–2005, 2007(O), 27 3A/4A North Regional Indoor/Outdoor Track Championships, 1995-2006(I) 1990–2004, 2006(O) and three 3A/4A Maryland State Outdoor Track Championships, 2002, 2005–2006. They were four times the 3A/4A Maryland State Outdoor Track Championship runner-ups: 1998, 1999, 2003, 2004. In 2009 outdoor track season, the Doves took cities, regionals and states, becoming the 2009 Outdoor Track State Champs.

== Activities ==
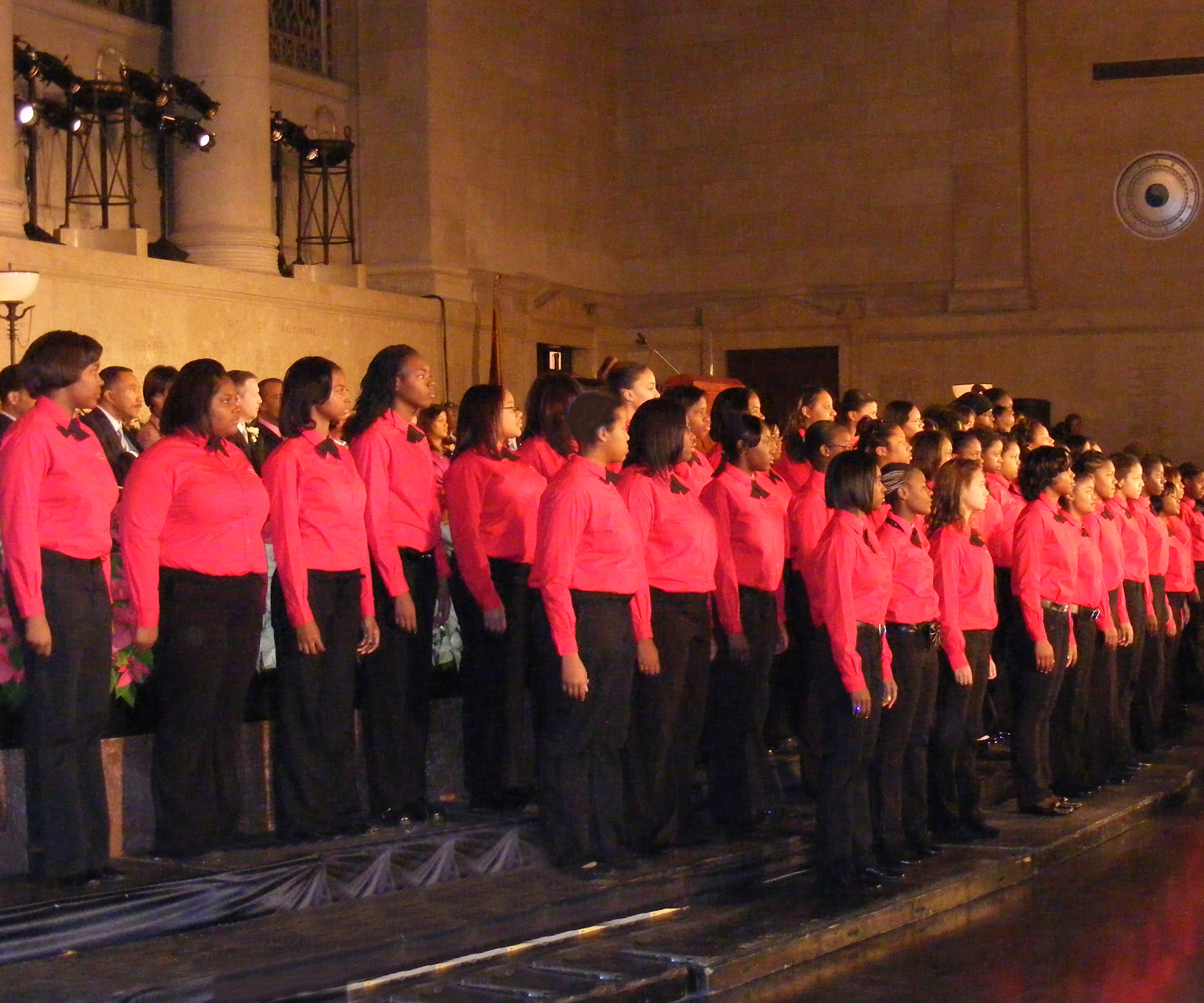
Western High School Choir

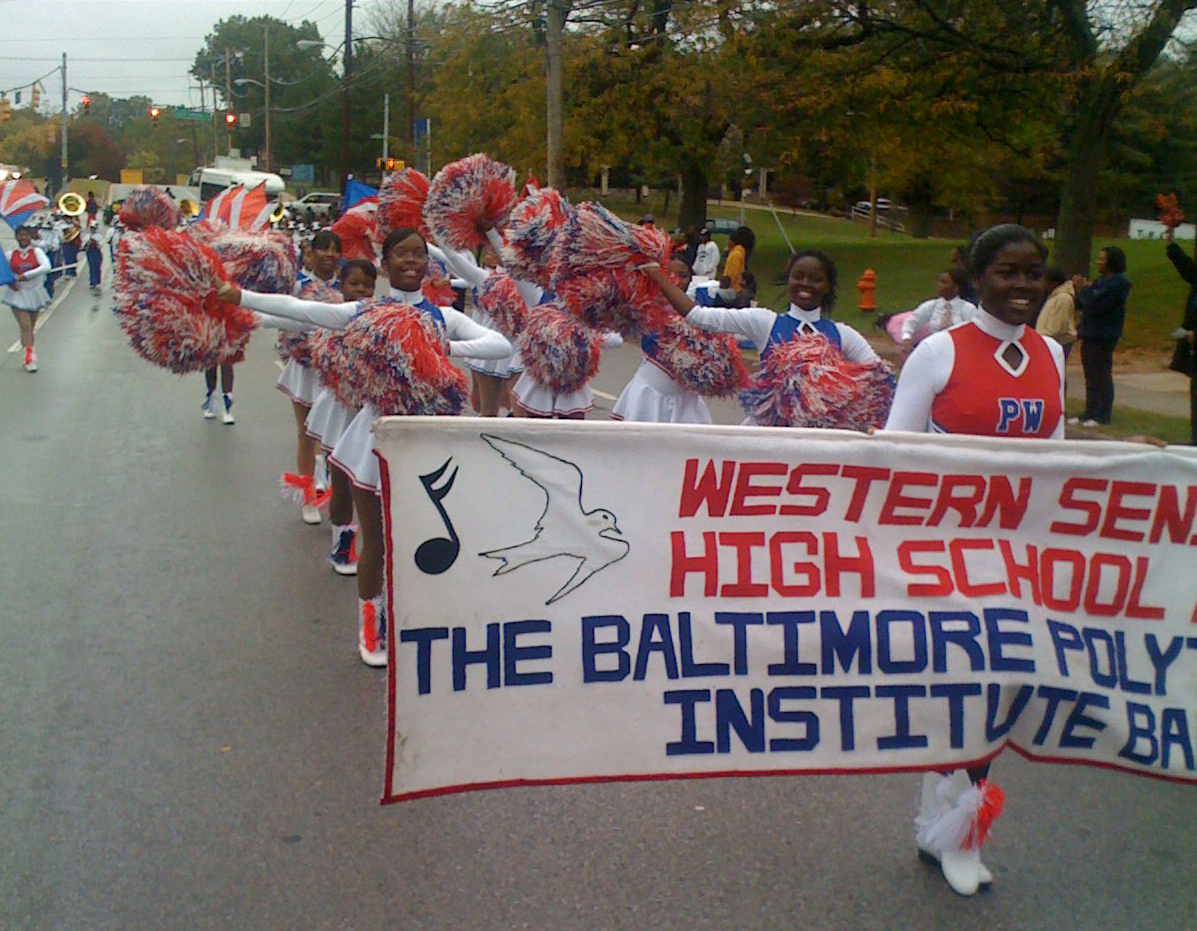
Poly-Western Band at the 2008 Morgan State University Homecoming Parade

== Traditions ==
Big Sister, Little Sister Program
This is an informal program when the juniors of the new school year pick little sisters from the incoming freshmen. With the incoming class of 2009, the "official" program went on hiatus until the school year of 2010–2011.
Freshman Day
The freshmen have an outdoor picnic.
Sophomore Parent-Daughter Tea
Parents of sophomores join their daughters for a tea in appreciation of the hard work their parents have done for them.
Junior Day
An assembly is held in honor of the juniors, who wear their class colors on this day.
Senior Inaugural
The new seniors are welcomed into the school. Traditionally the seniors wear all white and get the rest of the day off after the assembly.
Senior Farewell
The entire school says goodbye to the old seniors. The juniors sing the farewell song to the outgoing seniors. The seniors also wear all white on this day.
Revel
The annual spring fair

Western has four sets of traditional class colors. Each class inherits their class colors as freshmen. The colors are:

- Purple and gold
- Maroon and gold
- Blue and gold
- Black and gold

== Graduation ==
Western High School's graduation is traditionally held on a Saturday in even years and on a Sunday in odd years, in June. This is because it shares an athletic complex (namely the football field) with its brother school, Baltimore Polytechnic Institute. The girls wear white, ankle-length dresses and carry red roses during the commencement ceremony. It is also customary to release white doves, Western's mascot.

== Notable alumnae ==
- Rosalie Silber Abrams, Maryland politician
- Florence E. Bamberger, American pedagogue, school supervisor, and progressive education advocate
- Trazana Beverley (1963), actress, 1977 Tony Award winner
- Jill P. Carter, Maryland state senator and delegate, 41st District
- Farai Chideya, author and journalist
- Marilyn Crispell, pianist and composer
- Liebe Sokol Diamond (1947), notable pediatric orthopedic surgeon and inductee of the Maryland Women's Hall of Fame
- Tamara Dobson (1965), actress, best known for her role as "Cleopatra Jones"
- Mildred Dunnock actress
- Lisa A. Gladden (1982), member of the Maryland State Senate, 41st District
- Cheryl Glenn (1969), Maryland State Delegate, 45th District
- Gladys Goldstein, artist and art instructor
- Nancy Grasmick, former Maryland State Superintendent of Schools
- Sarah T. Hughes, judge who, after the assassination of John F. Kennedy, swore in Lyndon B. Johnson aboard Air Force One
- Penny Johnson Jerald actress
- Ruth Krauss, attended but left after sophomore year.
- Robin Quivers, American radio personality, author, and actress, best known for being the long-running news anchor and co-host of The Howard Stern Show.
- Stephanie Rawlings-Blake (1988), 49th Mayor of the City of Baltimore
- Nancy Grace Roman, astronomer who was one of the first female executives at NASA
- Amalie Rothschild (1932) artist
- Carolyn Scruggs, Maryland's Secretary of Public Safety
- Elissa Silverman, at-large member of the Council of the District of Columbia
- Anna Deavere Smith (1967), actress, professor, writer
- Henrietta Szold, founder of Hadassah

== Notable instructors ==
- Breezy Bishop, girls' basketball coach at Western for 24 seasons; inducted into the Women's Basketball Hall of Fame in 2000.
- Catherine Anne Cesnik (1942-1969), Catholic religious sister who was murdered

== Principals ==
- David E. Weglein (1876–1950), appointed 1906
