= Gladys Goldstein =

American painter

- Gladys Goldstein in her studio, 1982
- Born: Gladys V. Hack; 1918; Newark, Ohio, US
- Died: March 13, 2010 (aged 91-92); Baltimore, Maryland, US
- Resting place: Oheb Shalom Memorial Park, Reisterstown, Maryland

Gladys Goldstein (1918 – March 13, 2010) was an American artist who lived and worked within the art community of Baltimore, Maryland. Having begun as a representational artist specializing in portraits, she achieved recognition first for abstractions that were clearly based on natural forms and later for abstractions whose origin in natural forms was imperceptible. She was known for her deft handling of light and color in these works: atmospheric and subtle in some of them, intense and garish in others. Some critics saw an impressionist impulse in her paintings while others noted an expressionist ability to imbue them with emotion. In 1958 a critic said, "In nature Mrs. Goldstein finds a constant change in mood through patterns, rhythms, color; flamboyant now, wistfully delicate tomorrow; light, light that is reflected, light that is absorbed, light that is charged with the buoyancy of champagne or as quietly, morosely romantic, as any passage of Baudelaire." Goldstein chose to be a regional artist. She occasionally exhibited elsewhere but did not actively promote her career outside a mid-Atlantic region centered on Baltimore. She taught art for most of her long career, first in classes held in community centers and later in Baltimore's College of Notre Dame.

== Early life and training ==
Born in Ohio, she was brought to Baltimore when her family relocated there in 1920. She took art classes as a child. After graduating from that city's Western High School, she attended, successively, Johns Hopkins and Columbia universities, the Art Students League of New York, and the Maryland Institute College of Art. While taking still more art classes in a summer session at Pennsylvania State College, she decided to become a professional artist.

== Career in art ==
At the beginning of her career she used Gladys V. Hack as her professional name. In the late 1940s Goldstein joined the Art Group of the Baltimore Branch, National League of American Pen Women. The group held annual exhibitions of members' art in the Peale Museum. The art on display was said to be predominantly representational and Goldstein's contributions were mostly portraits. In 1950 she became head of the Art Group and a year later she was jointly responsible for arranging the Baltimore branch's annual show. In 1952 she participated in an exhibition at the National Gallery of Art in Washington, D.C. that was held during the biennial convention of the National League. A year later she participated in a large exhibition of regional artists at the Baltimore Museum of Art. By this time she was using Gladys Hack Goldstein as her professional name.

At the end of that year she organized a show designed to sell paintings based on size rather than artistic value and priced low enough to be purchased as holiday gifts. The objective, she said, was to enable local citizens "to acquire an appreciation of original pictures by contemporary artists." The painting that she offered for sale was a departure from her earlier work. Called "Tree and Pink Sky," it was entirely abstract. She later said her transition from realist portraits to nature-derived abstractions was sudden and complete, but a fellow artist and art instructor, James G.A. Murphy, said that she continued to make portraits for private sale, but would only exhibit her abstract work.

In the early 1950s Goldstein joined a local group called the Painters' Seminar and in January 1956 she participated in, and help to hang, an exhibition of members' paintings in the lobby of a movie theater called the Film Center. The two paintings she showed, "Lights" and "Foliage of the Fall," were both abstracts. The critic for the Baltimore Sun said these two works dominated the show. In February 1956 she won second prize in the Maryland Artists Exhibition at the Baltimore Museum of Art. The award-winning painting, "Big City," was also the favorite of the show's visitors whose votes put it at the top of the best-liked list. A few months later, she received a best-in-show award for an oil painting in the art exhibition that accompanied the biennial conference of the National League of American Pen Women. In November she was given a solo exhibition at the Baltimore Museum of Arts. Her work appeared in one gallery while two other Baltimore artists, Shelby Shackelford and William Waller, were given separate solo shows. In 1956 Goldstein began using Gladys Goldstein rather than Gladys Hack Goldstein as her professional name. In 1957 Goldstein was given a solo exhibition at the Duveen-Graham Galleries in New York. She showed fifteen oil paintings along with watercolors and some drawings. a critic for the New York Times gave the show a positive review, saying "Her most promising work is in a lyrical vein; softly rendered drifts of color, freely moving over a luminous base."

In May 1959, when her work appeared in an invitational exhibition at Morgan State University, a critic for the Baltimore Sun said "Gladys Goldstein seldom fails to furnish a fresh insight on whatever matter she undertakes; her "Blossom," the sparest imaginable oil-on-paper, seems composed of light." In December of the same year her paintings appeared in a solo exhibition in the lobby of a motion picture theater called the Playhouse. Regarding the show, the same Baltimore Sun critic said, "Her Playhouse show is not a major effort given the aspiration of the recent oils, but in its small way it is perfection." In February of the next year she showed with Amalie Rothschild, Bernard Perlman, and William Waller in a four-artist exhibition at the I.F.A. Galleries in Washington, D.C. and in September she showed with Lowell Nesbitt in a two-artist exhibition at Johns Hopkins University. Regarding her work in the latter, a Sun said, "As always, her sources are nature in its multiple aspects: the sea, tempestuous or calm, a summer landscape, a stony bank at the first moment of spring. But Mrs. Goldstein increasingly works toward essences; the literal fact becomes the esthetic fact, for she is, above all things a painter.... With a touch of brush, artist turns the literal into the esthetic."

The Baltimore Sun gave extensive coverage to a solo exhibition held in a Baltimore suburban gallery in 1963. The newspaper's article, by Robert G. Breen, included comments by Goldstein and others about a new direction her work had taken. It said she aimed at establishing what she called "horizontal perspective" and quoted her description of it. She said, "This perspective is perspective in space. It moves across the canvas, not back into the canvas. But it moves across in layers. This does not violate the picture plane but simply creates an illusion of movement by virtue of the depth created horizontally in flat layers, each layer retaining its own identity, yet uniting itself with the whole." The Sun gave a further description in reviewing another solo show the following year. The author said, "has set herself the sticky problem of capturing space and light by almost completely abstract means.... Mrs. Goldstein is thus working with layers of light—near and far and median—something as evanescent as smoke and more capricious." The exhibition was mounted in the library of College of Notre Dame, the school in Baltimore where Goldstein was then an art instructor.

During the 1960s and 1970s Goldstein's work continued to appear frequently in group or solo exhibitions held in non-commercial settings such as colleges, community centers, religious organizations, benefit auctions, and municipal spaces. By 1976 she had participated in somewhat more than 150 exhibitions according to an article in the Baltimore Sun. She showed less frequently than before in commercial galleries such as the I.F.A. Gallery in Washington. When she showed at Villa Julie College in 1972, Lincoln F. Johnson, Baltimore Sun critic, wrote that, "Villa Julie College is showing works by Gladys Goldstein, abstractions which operate, most of them, as visual metaphors for states of nature." "Elegant and refined," he added, "they sometimes have the appearance of precious objects."

Oil paintings and gouaches had predominated in Goldstein's output until the late 1970s when she began to produce collages and other mixed-media work. Writing about a solo exhibition of close to fifty paintings and collages she had made during the previous few years, Elisabeth Stevens, a Baltimore Sun critic, called the collages "shimmering works featuring painstakingly placed fragments of foil, newspaper clippings and printed papers." In the 1980s showed paintings in square format that contained square and rectangular design elements. She told a reviewer that she found these shapes to be "peaceful and elegant," having "a purity of form" and the possibility of endless variations. At the end of the decade she showed mixed-media pieces which a critic called "collaged paintings," having on their surfaces pieces of paper and fabric as well as sand. They were "two-dimensional, non-illusionistic and non-representational," but they nonetheless suggested "land and landscape," "calligraphy and hieroglyph," and occasionally "stained glass window."

Critics had increasingly seen inconsistency in Goldstein's work. They saw some high-quality pieces alongside ones that disappointed them. Regarding an exhibition at a commercial gallery in 1991, John Dorsey, of the Baltimore Sun, wrote: "Goldstein is nothing if not erratic. When her abstractions succeed, they're a delight to behold. When they don't, they're frustratingly disappointing. It's not as if they're someone else's pictures or as if they needed work; they're unmistakably hers, they're unquestionably finished and they're clearly professional -- but they somehow just don't make it." He added, "That's not to say that Goldstein, even when disappointing, is a bad artist. She works at a level that always deserves respect. But at her best the level is a lot higher than that." Between this time and her death nineteen years later, Goldstein seems to have stopped exhibiting, or, at any rate, news reports of exhibits stopped appearing. She died on March 20, 2010. After her death, a curator said that during her career she had "focused on creating and teaching art and was not as interested in the financial gain through the sale of her pieces."

=== Artistic style ===
My canvases are not explicit statements, but hints of things that are, or were, or might have been—of memories, of feelings.

— Gladys Goldstein, "Gladys H. Goldstein," Frederick N. Rasmussen, Baltimore Sun, March 20, 2010, page 16

Gladys Goldstein, Babushka, about 1935, oil on canvas, 20 x 16 inches

Gladys Goldstein, Sunflowers, 1968, mixed media on canvas, 36 x 48 inches

Gladys Goldstein, Peace Doves, 1974, oil on canvas, 50 x 50 inches

Gladys Goldstein, Summer Garden, watercolor on paper, 1980, 18 1/4 x 23 1/2 inches

Goldstein began her career as a representational painter. In the late 1940s she showed realist portraits in the exhibitions of the League of Pen Women. Babushka, painted about 1935 and shown at right, is one of her earliest works. When she turned to abstraction in the early 1950s, she took natural objects as the basis for her work. "Sunflowers," of 1968, shown at left illustrates this style. During the 1970s, she handled references to nature more obliquely, as seen in "Peace Doves" of 1974, shown at right. Thereafter her work became more purely abstract. "Summer Garden" of 1980, shown at left, is a painting of this type. Many of her mid-career paintings were notable for their handling of light. She possessed an ability, as one critic said, to produce works that seem to be "composed of light." Another said her paintings appeared to have "layers of filmy colored veils with one color moving into the next." Goldstein said she aimed to show light coming from within the canvas,... a living force from within."

During roughly the first half of her long career she worked mainly in oil on canvas, supplemented by gouaches on paper and some drawings. She employed impasto for many of the early works and used the brush more and more toward the mid-point of her career. Later, she made many paintings in mixed media, collage forms and sometimes used staining and dripping techniques and incorporated metallics in her work. A critic said she maintained "extraordinary control" over her collages, weaving items "into the fabric of the painting so that it is the image rather than the materials which take precedence." Another said, "Her collages are small, shimmering works featuring painstakingly placed fragments of foil, newspaper clippings and printed papers." "Candy Wrappers," a small undated collage, shown at right, is an example of this style. She said, "I will sometimes take an object that I find on the floor or something that I've collected and I'll paste it on the canvas because that is part of living."

"There's no substitute for intuition in painting. One doesn't know why he puts a dot at a certain point on a canvas, but feels that it is necessary, to do so,"

— Gladys Goldstein, "3 Maryland Artists Will Display Works," Baltimore Sun, November 30, 1956, page 12

During the 1980s, Goldstein focused on square and rectangular shapes. Of one of these paintings, "Signals," shown at left, a critic wrote, "the colors—reds, greens, blues, pinks—are beautiful and they glow almost as if they were stained glass." Goldstein said the shapes had intrigued her for a long time. She found them to be "peaceful and elegant" and said her response to them sometimes "verges on the mystic. Some of these paintings were themselves squares and some were as large as six feet long or high.

Toward the end of her career Goldstein began to supplant oils with acrylics and to combine organic forms with geometric ones. In 1991 a critic said she made "subtle use of color and a reserved but sensuous touch to create graceful, somewhat veiled, almost seductive effects." During this period she also made prints using a technique that originated in Mexico in 1970 and was called mixographia. Employing a beeswax surface rather than a metal plate or lithographic stone, this printing process allowed the artist to add a three-dimensional texture to her work. The untitled and undated print shown at right ("mixographia print") is an example of the prints she made using this technique.

== Art teacher ==
In the mid-1950s Goldstein began to teach art in a program called "Forest Park Evening Classes" in Baltimore. The program offered instruction in practical subjects such as typing and dressmaking at no cost to Baltimore residents and was directed by her husband, Edward H. Goldstein. It had begun to offer art classes in 1950. In 1957 she also began to teach classes at the newly-opened Metropolitan School of Art. Aiming to give art students an alternative to the relatively conservative instruction offered at the Maryland Institute of Art, the school taught amateurs and professionals, children and adults, in day and evening classes from that year until 1960. The following year and for the next two, she taught at the Maryland Institute of Art. In 1959 she began teaching art classes in the recreation center of Oheb Shalom temple and from the early 1960s she left that position to teach at the Jewish Community Center. In 1964 Goldstein joined the faculty of the College of Notre Dame as an art instructor. In 1982, at the age of 62, she left her teaching jobs at the Jewish Community Center and Notre Dame, but continued to give private instruction.

== Personal life and family ==
Goldstein's father was Samuel Edward Hack, a ceramics artist and instructor. Her mother was Dorothy (Isaacson) Hack. Her paternal grandparents had been born in Polish Russia. Her paternal grandfather, Simon, operated a shoe repair business in Baltimore. Her paternal grandmother, Goldie, died in 1915, age 44. She had an older brother, Ernest, and a younger one, Homer.

In the early 1940s Goldstein married Edward H. Goldstein, an administrator in the Baltimore public school system. The couple had a son, William N. Goldstein (1943-2006), a psychiatrist and professor of psychiatry at Georgetown University Medical Center in Washington, D.C.

Goldstein died from complications after surgery at Seasons Hospice in Randallstown, Maryland on March 13, 2010, and was interred in Oheb Shalom Memorial Park, Reisterstown, Maryland.

Mattilda Bernstein Sycamore, one of Goldstein's grandchildren, wrote a book that centers around their relationship, and Goldstein's life and work, as well as other related topics, titled Touching the Art, published by Soft Skull Press in 2023.
