= Baltimore Hebrew Congregation =

Reform synagogue in Baltimore, Maryland, US

- Location on the north-western edge of greater Baltimore, Maryland

Religion
- Affiliation: Reform Judaism
- Ecclesiastical or organizational status: Synagogue
- Status: Active
- Notable 1951–1969 artworks by: George Aarons (sculptures); Arnold Henry Bergier (judaica); Nissan Engel (stained-glass); William M. Halsey (mural); Amalie Rothschild (interior design)

Location
- Location: 7401 Park Heights Avenue, Pikesville, Baltimore County, Maryland 21208
- Country: United States
- Interactive map of Baltimore Hebrew Congregation
- Coordinates: 39°22′19″N 76°42′34″W

Architecture
- Architects: 1845: Robert Cary Long, Jr.; William Reasin; 1891: Charles L. Carson; 1951: Percival Goodman
- Type: Synagogue
- Style: 1845: Greek Revival; 1891: Byzantine Revival; 1951: Art Deco; Moderne; International
- Established: 1830 (as a congregation)
- Completed: 1845 (Lloyd Street); 1891 (Madison Avenue); 1951 (Park Heights Avenue)
- Site area: 17 acres (6.9 ha)

Website
- baltimorehebrew.org

The Baltimore Hebrew Congregation is a Reform Jewish congregation and synagogue located at 7401 Park Heights Avenue, in Pikesville, on the border of Baltimore City and Baltimore County, Maryland, in the United States.

== History ==
Originally named Nidche Yisroel (transliterated from Hebrew as "Scattered of Israel"), the synagogue was founded in 1830, and for the first fifteen years of its existence, services were held in a small room above a local grocery. It was originally an Orthodox synagogue, but became Reform officially in 1871. The pressure from the Congregation for modernization was such that its Orthodox first rabbi, Abraham Rice, resigned his position in 1849 over this question.

In 1845, the congregation moved to Lloyd Street under the new name, Baltimore Hebrew Congregation. The new synagogue was dedicated by the Rev. S. M. Isaacs of New York and the Rev. Isaac Leeser of Philadelphia, together with the ministers of the congregation, Abraham Rice and A. Ansell (Anshel). That building, the Lloyd Street Synagogue, the third-oldest synagogue building in the United States, is now preserved as part of the Jewish Museum of Maryland.

Henry Hochheimer served as rabbi from 1849 to 1859. As the city of Baltimore and its Jewish population continued to grow, so too did the number of congregants, and also the size of its endowment. In 1891 the congregation moved to Madison Avenue, where it built the Baltimore Hebrew Congregation Synagogue, added to the National Register of Historic Places in 1976. Adolf Guttmacher was rabbi from 1891 to 1915.

As the Jewish population of Baltimore moved northwest, the congregation relocated to the Park Heights Avenue synagogue building in 1951, in Pikesville, on the border of Baltimore City and Baltimore County. Set on 17 acres (6.9 ha) and designed by Percival Goodman in a combination of the Art Deco, Moderne, and International styles, the red brick building is notable for both its expansive design and artwork that includes eight George Aarons' sculptural reliefs depicting Jewish ethics, a William M. Halsey mural, Arnold Henry Bergier–designed judaica for the sanctuary, Amalie Rothschild cubist–designed tapestry and doors, and 16 stained–glass windows by Nissan Engel that depict the history of the Jewish people from Creation to the Holocaust and the founding of the State of Israel.

== The Day School at Baltimore Hebrew ==
Under the direction of Rabbi Murray Saltzman, BHC senior rabbi at the time, BHC added a day school to its educational programming in 1991 for children from 18 months through 8th grade. In early 2008, it was officially renamed The Day School at Baltimore Hebrew. The Day School received accreditation from the State of Maryland and the Association of Independent Maryland Schools (AIMS), was a member of the Center for Jewish Education of The Associated, Progressive Association of Reform Day Schools (PARDeS) and The Association of Independent Schools (NAIS). It closed after the 2012–2013 school year. It was slated to reopen as a new school, The Independent Academy, as a joint venture with The Cardin School, but the Cardin school pulled out and closed and the new school did not materialize.

== Notable members ==
- Louis E. Eliasberg (1896–1976), American financier and numismatist
- Steve Krulevitz (born 1951), American-Israeli tennis player

== See also ==
- History of the Jews in Maryland
- Oldest synagogues in the United States
