= Congregation Shearith Israel (Baltimore) =

Orthodox synagogue in Baltimore, Maryland, United States

- Hebrew: קהילת שארית ישראל דבאלטימאר
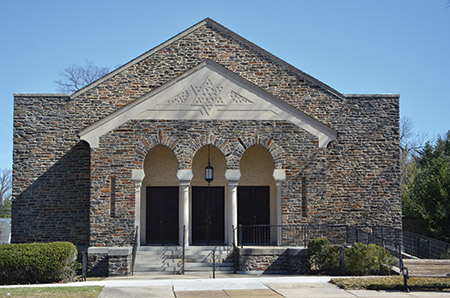
- Shearith Israel, Glen Avenue synagogue

- Location in Baltimore, Maryland

Religion
- Affiliation: Orthodox Judaism
- Ecclesiastical or organizational status: Synagogue
- Leadership: Rabbi Yaakov Hopfer
- Status: Active

Location
- Location: 5835 Park Heights Avenue, Park Heights, Baltimore, Maryland 21215
- Country: United States
- Interactive map of Congregation Shearith Israel
- Coordinates: 39°21′21″N 76°41′15″W

Architecture
- Founder: Abraham Joseph Rice
- Established: 1879 (merged congregation): 1862 (as Shevet Achim); 1851 (as Shearith Israel)
- Completed: c. 1893 (McCulloh Street); 1925 (Glen Avenue)

Website
- sicbaltimore.org

Congregation Shearith Israel (Hebrew: קהילת שארית ישראל דבאלטימאר; nicknamed The Glen Avenue Shul) is a historic Orthodox Jewish congregation and synagogue, located at 5835 Park Heights Avenue, in Park Heights, northwest Baltimore, Maryland, in the United States.

Shearith Israel is the oldest Baltimore congregation to remain Orthodox throughout its history.

== History ==
Shearith Israel was the second congregation served by rabbi Abraham Joseph Rice in Baltimore who opened Shearith Israel following his departure from Nidchei Yisrael (known today as The Baltimore Hebrew Congregation). Rice resigned his post in 1849 following the board's decision to reconstitute and adapt certain reforms and their subsequent appointment of Henry Hochheimer.

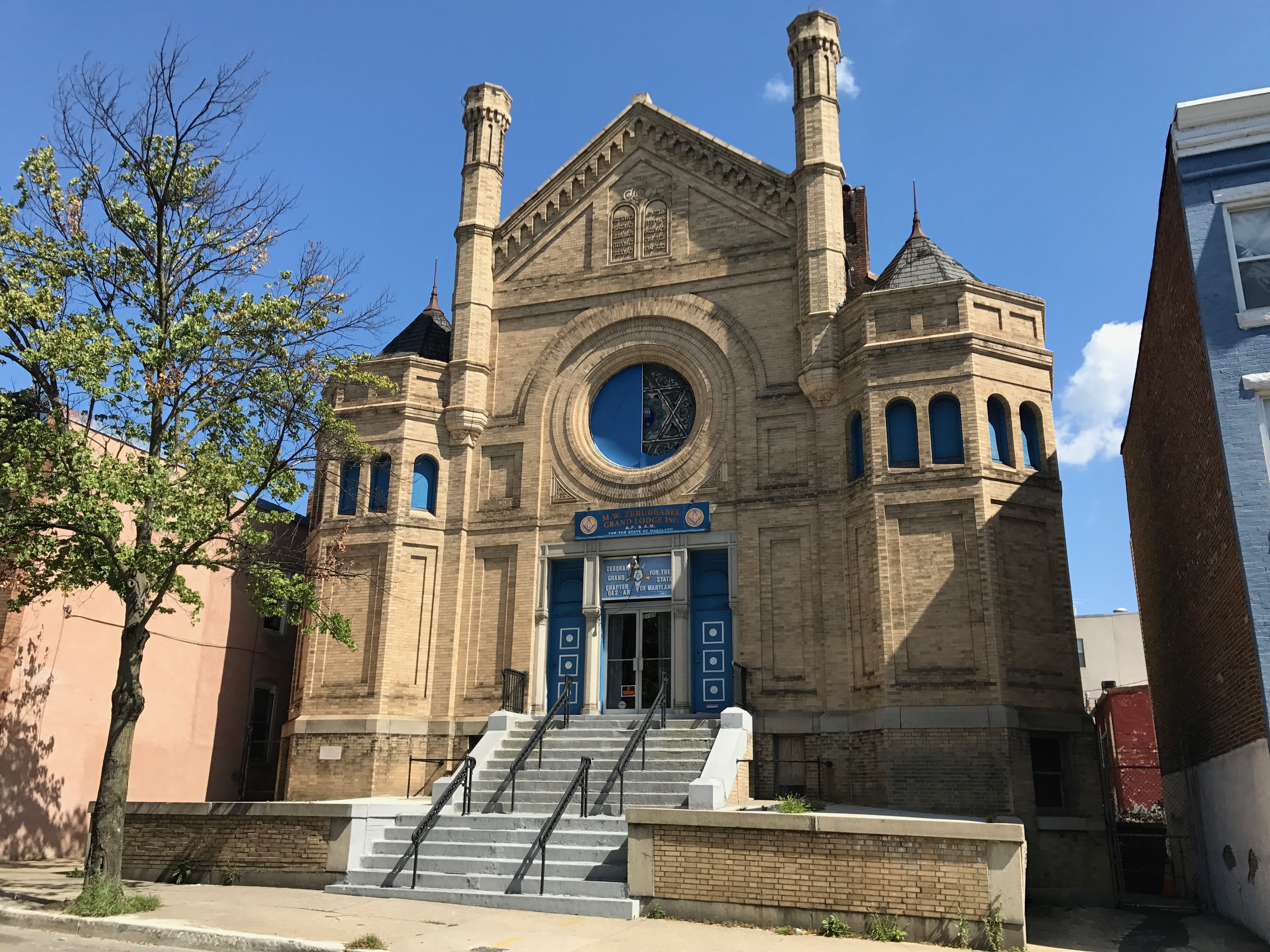
Former McCulloh Street synagogue, now Zerubabel Grand Lodge

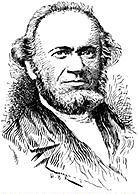
Rabbi Abraham Joseph Rice, c. 1845.

Rice founded the first synagogue in 1851 on Howard Street in a rented home; it is unclear whether they had a Minyan during the early years. The congregation was to later move to Greene and Redwood Streets (called German Street then, changed during World War I) after it merged with Congregation Shevet Achim of Eutaw Street in 1879 (the building today is used as Calvary Methodist Episcopal Church South).

=== McCulloh Street synagogue ===
At approximately 1905, the congregation built the McCulloh Street synagogue in the American Romanesque Revival style (with Moorish capitals, eastern-Gothic turrets, and a distinctive ocular window at the entrance). This synagogue was sold, approximately 1935, to become the Zerubabbel Grand Lodge, which it remains today.

The synagogue was dedicated on September 11, 1903. The McCulloh Street Synagogue closed in 1958. Included in the voting membership was Henry Hartogensis, the prominent orthodox Gabbai and financial officer, who had transferred from Chizuk Amuno

=== Upper Park Heights synagogue ===
Beginning in 1923, the board in the McCulloh synagogue appealed for a new building in Upper Park Heights, reflecting on the suburbanization of the Jewish community to streetcar suburbs of Park Heights, Druid Hill, and Garrison. The proposed project was commended for its frugality and conservatism, and was awarded the first mortgage granted to a synagogue by the Eutaw Savings Bank. Possibly due to the funds saved with the frugal architecture, innovations were put into place such as an improved mechitzah of curved wrought iron (the McCulloh Street synagogue only had an embankment wall) based on the design of the Hirsch-Breuer Congregation K’hal Adath Jeshurun (known as the Friedberger Anlage, or Synagogue of the Israelitische Religionsgesellschaft).

A member of the Kehillah, Nathan Adler, fundraised and planned a Mikveh in the building; the size of the structure was approved of by Rabbi Yisrael Meir Kagan, The Chofetz Chaim.

The dedication of the synagogue on Glen and Park Heights avenues (hence the name, the Glen Avenue Shul, then the only synagogue on Glen Avenue) took place in 1925, and the speakers were rabbis Isaiah Levy and Phillip Hillel Klein.

The constitution of the synagogue required that the only voting members (and those permitted for honors, such as Aliyah and Opening the Ark) were those who were Sabbath observant; despite the new synagogue having 150 members, less than 10 were voting members. This contributed to the breakoff and formation of Beth Jacob Congregation (now defunct) next door.

== Rabbinical leaders ==
The following individuals have served as rabbi of the Congregation Shearith Israel:

Ordinal (Note: The congregation considers its establishment date as 1879, following its merger with Shevet Achim. However, the forebears of the congregation start from 1851, with Rabbi Rice.)	Officeholder	Term start	Term end	Time in office	Notes
−	Abraham Joseph Rice	c. 1851	1862	10–11 years	The first ordained rabbi in the United States, Rice was a Talmid Chacham, and a strict adherent and fighter for Orthodoxy (he excommunicated Isaac Mayer Wise).
1	Dr. Abba Schepsel Schaffer	1893	1928	34–35 years	
2	Shimon Schwab	1937	1958	20–21 years	Brought to Baltimore from Germany on the suggestion of Rabbi Dr. Leo Jung. Schwab led the congregation through the move from McCulloh Street to Glen Avenue, and the growth of the observant community, many of them German refugees.
3	Menachem Mendel Feldman	1958	1986	27–28 years	
4	Yaakov Hopfer	1987	incumbent	38–39 years	

== See also ==
- History of the Jews in Baltimore
- Khal Adath Jeshurun – the "sister synagogue" following the Schwab era; in Washington Heights, New York
