= Murray Saltzman =

Murray Saltzman (November 26, 1929 – January 5, 2010) was an American reform Jewish rabbi and civil rights leader.

== Biography ==
Saltzman was born to a Russian-immigrant family in Brooklyn, New York, the youngest of three sons. After first enrolling in Syracuse University, Saltzman attended University of Cincinnati and studied to become a rabbi. He became ordained in 1956 at the Hebrew Union College-Jewish Institute of Religion.

Saltzman was an assistant rabbi at Congregation Emanu-El B'ne Jeshrun in Milwaukee, Wisconsin, rabbi of B'nai Abraham Synagogue in Hagerstown, Maryland, and rabbi at Temple Beth-El in Chappaqua, New York. He then spent eleven years as chief rabbi at Indianapolis Hebrew Congregation. From 1978 to 1996, he was chief rabbi at Baltimore Hebrew Congregation. After retiring to Florida, Saltzman became the part-time rabbi of Bat Yam Temple of the Islands Tzedakah in Sanibel, Florida.

A leader in both the Indianapolis and Baltimore communities, Saltzman appeared regularly as a co-host with William Hudnut on the Indianapolis public television program Focus on Faith, expanding religious education though the creation of Baltimore Hebrew Day School, and instituting several social justice programs in both cities.

Saltzman participated in many civil rights protests throughout the 1960s, marching with Martin Luther King Jr. on several occasions. In 1964, he was one of several rabbis arrested during the St. Augustine Movement protests in St. Augustine, Florida. The incident was the largest mass arrest of rabbis in history.

In 1975, Saltzman was appointed by President Gerald Ford to the U.S. Commission on Civil Rights. In 1983, Saltzman co-authored an op-ed column with fellow commissioners Mary Frances Berry and Blandina Ramirez in which the three accused President Ronald Reagan of treating the Commission as "lap dogs" rather than "watch dogs." In a controversial move, President Reagan fired all three commissioners. Berry and Ramirez successfully sued to return to the commission on the grounds that it was meant to be a nonpartisan entity. Saltzman chose not to be part of the suit.

He died on January 5, 2010, in Fort Myers, Florida, from pancreatic cancer, leaving behind his wife Esther (née Herskowitz), three children, and six grandchildren.
