= David E. Weglein =

American educator

David E. Weglein (1876 – October 10, 1950) was an American educator, and superintendent of Baltimore City public schools.

== Biography ==
David E. Weglein was born and raised in Baltimore, Maryland. He attended high school at Baltimore City College and received his bachelor's degree from Johns Hopkins University. His work at Hopkins earned him the Peabody award ($100), which Weglein applied to his graduate education at Columbia University in New York.

After Graduate School Weglein joined the Baltimore City Public School System. While at school No. 03 Weglein returned to Johns Hopkins University to obtain his PhD.

Shortly after graduation in 1906, Weglein was appointed as principal of Western High School located in Baltimore, MD. When Henry West was named as Baltimore City's superintendent, he chose Weglein to be assistant superintendent. In 1924 West retired making Weglein superintendent of Baltimore City public schools.

Weglein retired in 1945.
