= Pyramid Atlantic Art Center =

Non-profit contemporary arts center in Maryland, US

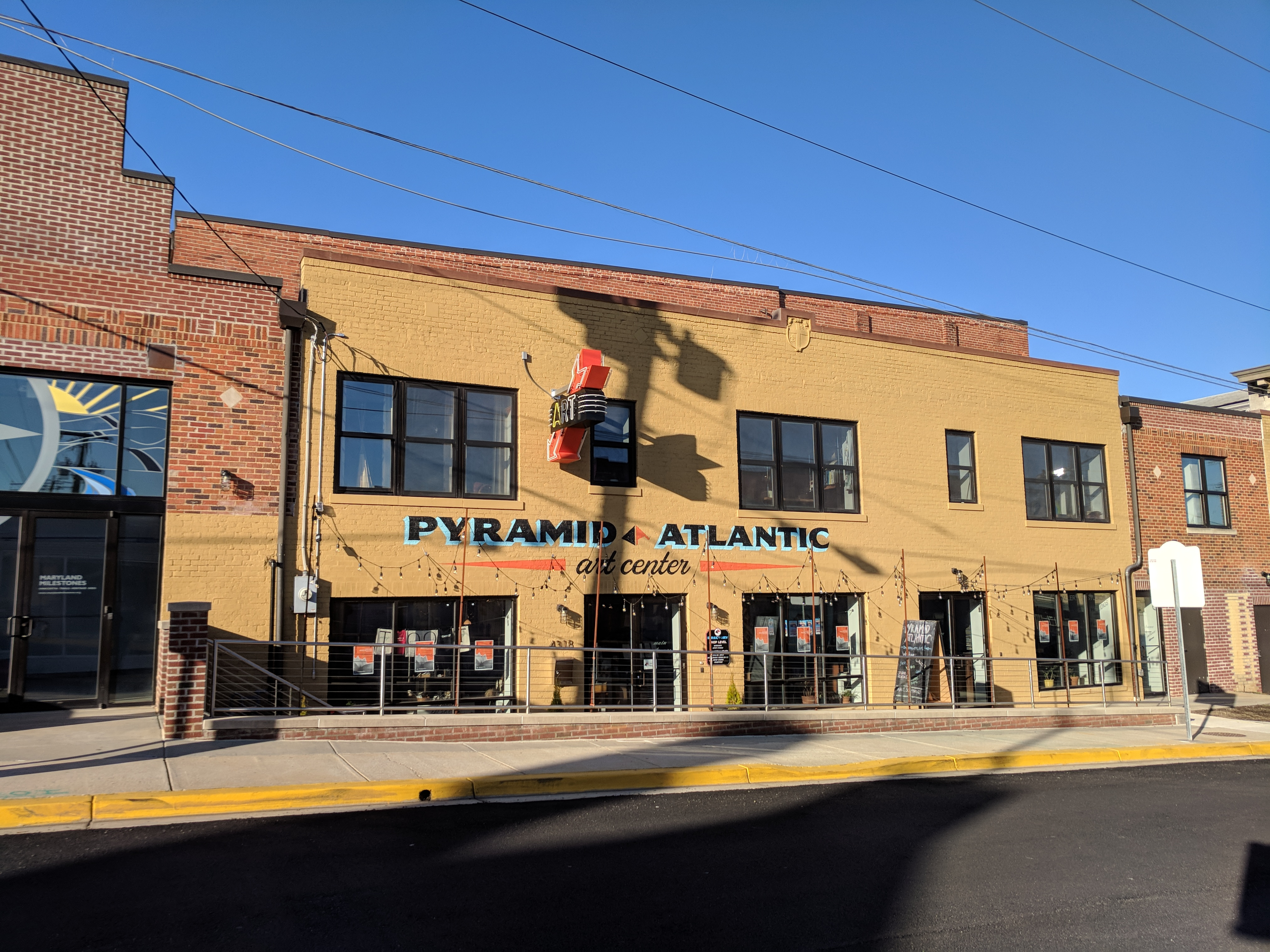
- PAAC's location in Hyattsville, Maryland.
- Formation: 1981
- Founder: Helen C. Frederick
- Founded at: Baltimore, Maryland, US
- Purpose: Arts
- Headquarters: Hyattsville, Maryland, US
- Coordinates: 38°57′09.7″N 76°56′27.8″W
- Website: pyramidatlanticartcenter.org

Pyramid Atlantic Art Center (PAAC) is a 501(c)(3) non-profit contemporary arts center specializing in papermaking, printmaking, and book arts. They are currently located at 4318 Gallatin Street in Hyattsville, Maryland.

== History ==
The PAAC was founded in 1981 by artist Helen C. Frederick, and is located in Hyattsville, Maryland. It had previously been located in Baltimore in the 1980s and later Silver Spring from 2003 until 2017.

The center has an art gallery space; offers various artist opportunities and residencies; has multiple art studios including a printshop, papermaking studio, and bindery; and offers educational classes. Notable artists connected to PAAC include Renee Stout, Tanja Softic, Joyce Scott, William Christenberry, Hung Liu, Yuriko Yamaguchi, among others.

In 2018, the IFPDA Foundation gave a grant to PAAC for archiving and digitizing their print collection.

== See also ==
- Artist's book
