= Baltimore Leadership School for Young Women =

Location
- 128 W. Franklin Street; Baltimore, Maryland 21201; United States; 39°17′43″N 76°37′5″W

Information
- Type: Public charter
- Founder: Brenda Brown Rever
- Superintendent: Sonja Brookins Santelises
- School number: 348
- High School Principal: Christina Jacobs
- Middle School Principal: Tanea Moore
- CEO: Chevonne Hall
- Enrollment: 539 (2018)
- Website: blsyw.org

Baltimore Leadership School for Young Women (BLSYW, pronounced "Bliss") is a public charter middle and high school for girls in Mount Vernon, Baltimore, Maryland. It is the first public all girls' secondary school in the city that had both middle and senior high school levels.

== History ==
Founded by philanthropist and women's rights advocate Brenda Brown Rever, it opened in 2009 with 120 students. It initially only served 6th graders, and was located on the third floor of the Western High School building. The people of Western High School opposed the idea of BLSYW being housed in that building. In 2010 BLSYW moved into its permanent campus, the former headquarters of the Greater Baltimore Young Women's Christian Association (YWCA) in Mount Vernon, making it the first newly established public school in that area in a three decade period.

In June 2016 the school's first 12th grade class, made up of 60 students, graduated.

In 2017 director Amanda Lipitz released Step, a documentary about three students from the school who participate in a step dance competition. Bloomberg Philanthropies and the Baltimore Ravens contributed to the film's financing. Fox Searchlight Pictures received worldwide distribution rights for the film.

== Management ==
As of 2016 the head of the Enoch Pratt Free Library, Carla Hayden, is on the board of directors of BLSYW.

== Demographics ==
In 2016, 59 of the girls in the 12th grade class were low income African-Americans.
