= Schepsel Schaffer =

American rabbi (1862–1933)

Rev Dr. Schepsel Schaffer

Personal life
- Born: May 4, 1862 Bausk, Courland Governorate, Russian Empire
- Died: September 28, 1933 (aged 71)
- Buried: Baltimore Hebrew Cemetery
- Spouse: Anna Lepidus

Religious life
- Religion: Judaism
- Denomination: Orthodox Judaism

Jewish leader
- Position: Rabbi
- Synagogue: Congregation Shearith Israel

Schepsel Schaffer (Yiddish: אבא שבתי (שעפּסעל) שײפֿער; May 4, 1862 – September 28, 1933) was an American rabbi.

== Biography ==
Schepsel Schaffer was born on the first day of Shavuot, 5622, in Bausk, Courland. On his mother's side he was a descendant of Mordecai Jaffe, author of the Lebush. He was educated at the gymnasium of Libau, Courland, at the University of Berlin, and at the Rabbinical Seminary of Berlin.

In January 1893, Schaffer became rabbi of Congregation Shearith Israel in Baltimore, Maryland. He was president of the Baltimore Zion Association (from 1895) and honorary vice-president of the American Federation of Zionists, and he was twice a delegate to the Zionist Congress at Basel.

== Publications ==
- Das Recht und seine Stellung zur Moral nach talmudischer Sitten- und Rechtslehre. Berlin: H. Itzkowski. 1889.
