= George Aarons =

American sculptor (1896–1980)

- Born: Gregory Podubisky; 1896; St. Petersburg, Russia
- Died: 1980 (aged 83–84); Gloucester, Massachusetts, U.S.
- Education: Boston Museum of Fine Arts, Beaux-Arts Institute of Design
- Occupations: Sculptor, art teacher
- Organizations: Works Progress Administration (WPA)
- Known for: Public monuments, reliefs, sculptures
- Notable work: Gloucester's 350th Anniversary Commemorative Medal, WPA sculptures
- Awards: Multiple international recognitions

George Aarons (born Gregory Podubisky; 1896 in St. Petersburg, Russia – 1980 in Gloucester, Massachusetts) was a sculptor who lived and taught in Gloucester, Massachusetts, for many years until his death in 1980. He designed Gloucester's 350th Anniversary Commemorative Medal.

Aarons moved from Russia to the United States when he was ten. His father was a merchant. He began taking drawing classes during evenings at Dearborn Public School in Boston as a teenager and went on to study at the Boston Museum of Fine Arts in 1916. Aarons later moved to New York City to study with Jo Davidson, and other Paris-trained masters at the Beaux-Arts Institute. He eventually returned to the Boston area and established studios in Brookline and Gloucester, Massachusetts. During his lifetime, he was recognized internationally and won several prestigious awards.

Aarons had studios in Brookline, Massachusetts and Gloucester, Massachusetts where he produced large bronze and marble figures and wood carvings. He produced several projects for the Works Progress Administration including a group of three figures for the Public Garden (Boston), a longshoreman, fisherman and foundry worker, as well as a large relief (1938) for the South Boston Housing Project and façade of the Baltimore Hebrew Congregational Building (1956).

His works are at the Museum of Art in Ein Harod, Israel; Fitchburg Art Museum in Massachusetts, Musée de St. Denis in France; Hilles Library at Radcliffe College in Cambridge, Massachusetts; and Hillel House at Boston University in Massachusetts. He produced five

He did reliefs for Siefer Hall at Brandeis University in Waltham, Massachusetts (1950); Edward Filene (the founder of Filene's Department Store and a philanthropist) on the Boston Common; Fireman's Memorial in Beverly, Massachusetts; a memorial to Mitchell Frieman in Boston; the U.S. Post Office in Ripley, Mississippi; and at the Cincinnati Telephone Building; the Combined Jewish Philanthropies building in Boston (1965); and a commemorative medal for the 350th Anniversary of the City of Gloucester, Massachusetts (1972).

In the summer of 2003, the North Shore Arts Association of Gloucester held an exhibition of his work, and following is information that the North Shore Arts Association gathered for that exhibition.

Aarons summered and taught classes on Cape Ann for many years before moving to Gloucester full-time with his wife about 1950. While Aarons is best known locally for his domestic-scale works, he also executed numerous monumental, public commissions that can be found throughout the United States in cities such as Washington, D.C.; Baltimore, Maryland; and Cincinnati, Ohio; as well as in France and Israel.

After he graduated, he apprenticed under sculptors Richard Brooks, Robert Baker and Solon Borglum. He worked as a carpenter, shipbuilder, dishwasher and chimney sweep. He fashioned architectural decorations, including figures for fountains and now and then a few commissioned portraits. He returned to Boston by the early 1920s and began to exhibit his own works and get commissions for portraits, fountains and reliefs.

His sculptures from this time are dreamy and romantic in the realistic, academic style of the time. A painted portrait of the young Aarons that is included in the North Shore Arts Association exhibit shows a determined fellow with dark brown hair, a suit and bow tie. However, in 1922, he was living with his parents on Calder Street in Dorchester.

In the 1930s, Aarons adopted the streamlined, monumental style of the socialist works of the time. Aarons made money, as he would all his life, from commissions, selling his personal work and teaching sculpture, but the Depression of the 1930s was tough for everyone.

So Aarons found work though the federal Works Progress Administration, one of Franklin Roosevelt's New Deal programs. He received his first major commission when he was asked to create a public sculpture for the South Boston Harbor Village public housing project around 1937. He was elevated to the position of supervisor for the project and received a corresponding $5 pay increase to make his weekly salary $32. The raise convinced him he was fit to marry and he proposed to Gertrude Band, an attractive brunette dancer whom he had been dating for more than a year. They were married before the Harbor Village project was dedicated on Labor Day 1938.

In 1940, Gertrude and George bought an old barn in Brookline, where George set up his studio, with living quarters above. He taught students, mostly women, in the studio, but he was also busy with his own work.

In 1953, Aarons received a commission to carve a series of reliefs into limestone blocks on the facade of the Baltimore Hebrew Congregation in Maryland.

Aarons sculptures filled the Eagle Road barn until he put one small building behind it and, in 1971, another. He displayed his work outside in the garden between the buildings.

His statue of Thomas Jefferson decorated the office of the secretary of the treasury in Washington, D.C. His memorial to Edward A. Filene sat in Boston Common. He was commissioned by the city of Gloucester to design a medal to commemorate the city's 350 anniversary in 1972. He had exhibited at the Boston Museum of Fine Arts, Whitney Museum in New York, Dallas Museum of Art in Texas, Cleveland Museum of Art in Ohio, and Corcoran Gallery of Art in Washington, D.C. Locally, his works are on display at the Sawyer Free Library in Gloucester and Manchester Town Hall.

Aarons had a stroke in the mid-1970s that left him unable to speak. Gertrude kept to his side, but his declining health prevented him from being the artist he had been. Some old friends who had been students helped him with some sculptural work, but he seems to have done little after 1973. He died at Addison Gilbert Hospital in Gloucester on November 24, 1980, leaving behind Gertrude, who died in Gloucester on May 5, 1989.
