= Abraham Rice =

American rabbi

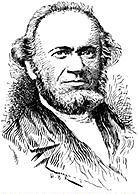
Rabbi Abraham Rice (Reiss)

Abraham Joseph Rice (born Abraham Reiss) (c. 1800 – 1862) was the first ordained rabbi to serve in a rabbinical position in the United States.

== Biography ==
Rice was born in 1800 or 1802 at Gochsheim, near Schweinfurt, Lower Franconia. An injury in infancy left him with a limp. He studied at the Würzburg yeshivah, and was ordained by Rabbi Abraham Bing. He continued his studies at the yeshivah of Rabbi Wolf Hamburger in Fürth, and then headed a small yeshivah in the village of Zell, near Würzburg. In the 1830s he married Rosalie Leucht, and in 1840 they immigrated to the United States. After a brief attempt at reviving the Jewish community in Newport, Rhode Island, he accepted an appointment as the first rabbi of Congregation Nidche Israel in Baltimore.

Rice usually delivered his sermons in German, and later occasionally in English, while he insisted on retaining all the traditional piyyutim in the prayers. His constant battle against assimilation and lax observance of shabbat and kashrut brought him into conflict with many of his congregants. When he decreed that Sabbath-breakers should not be called to the Torah, there was such resistance that he had to back down; but he insisted that while they could be called up, nobody should answer "amen" to the blessings they recited. After an 1842 incident in which he objected to Masonic rites held at a Jewish funeral, some members left the congregation and founded the Har Sinai Verein, the oldest continuously operating Reform congregation in the United States.

Rice was known throughout the United States and Germany as a learned Talmudist, and as the only ordained rabbi in the country he was asked to decide many questions of halacha. He was an uncompromising opponent of Reform, a frequent writer in Isaac Leeser's The Occident, and advocated establishing an American beth din to strengthen Jewish observance. In 1845 he established a Hebrew school, one of the earliest in the United States.

In 1849, finding it impossible to resist the demand for reforms at Nidche Israel, he resigned his position, founded his own synagogue which was strictly Orthodox; to support himself he opened a dry goods store, and then a grocery. He also began a minyan likely in his home at this time; this congregation was to evolve into Congregation Shearith Israel and remain Orthodox for its complete history. In 1862, he was asked to return to the rabbinate of Nidche Israel, with the promise that it would remain strictly Orthodox. He died several months later. In 1871, an organ was introduced and the Reform prayer book was adopted, and Nidche Israel became a Reform temple.
