= Helen C. Frederick =

American artist

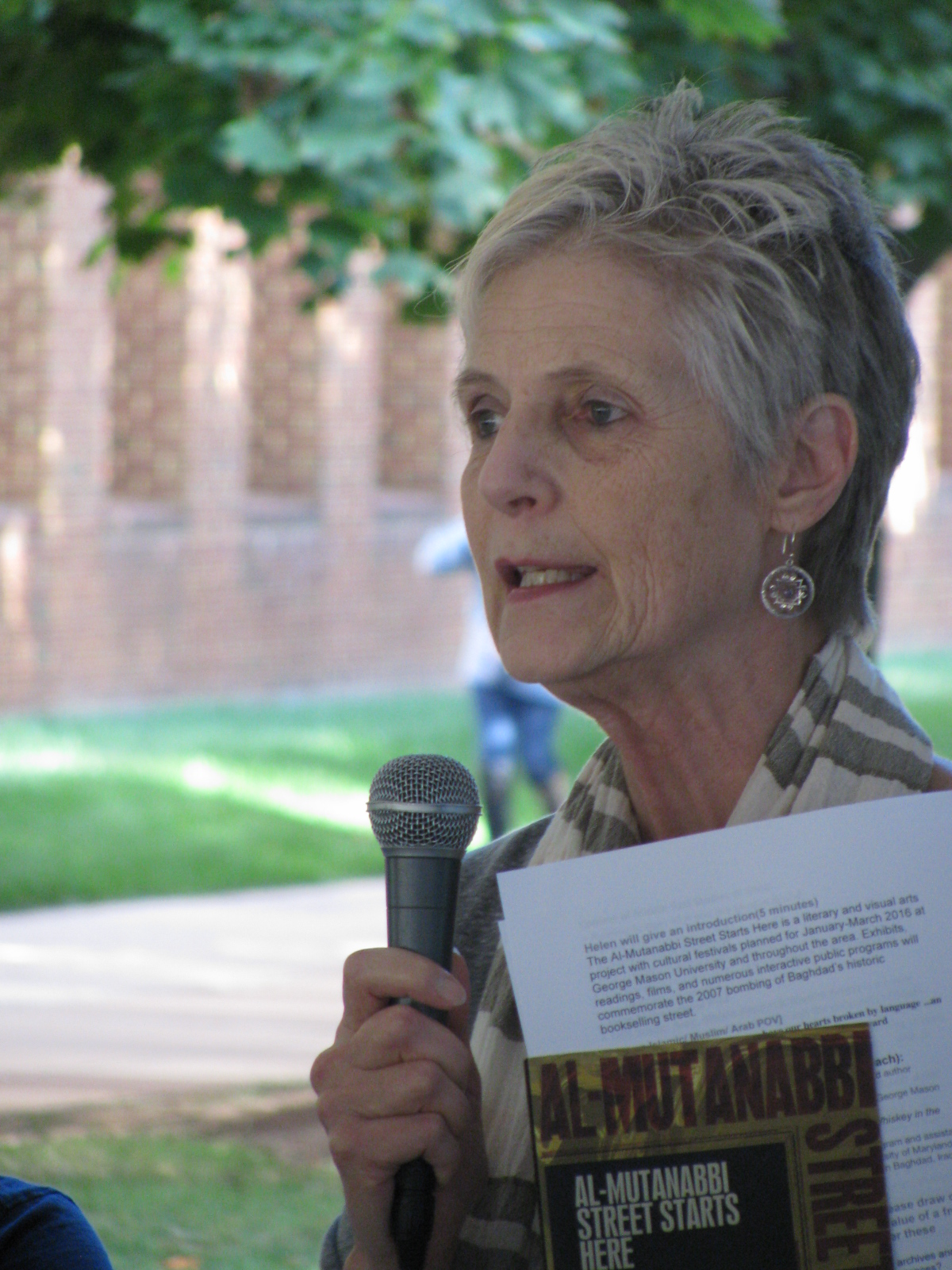
- Born: 1945 (age 80–81); Pottstown, Pennsylvania, United States
- Education: Rhode Island School of Design
- Organization: Pyramid Atlantic Art Center
- Known for: printmaking, papermaking
- Website: www.helenfrederick.com

Helen C. Frederick (born 1945) is an American artist, curator, and the founder of Pyramid Atlantic Art Center, an arts organization in Maryland. She is known mainly for printed media and large-scale works created by hand papermaking as a medium of expression that often incorporate the use of language. She has curated exhibitions such as Ten Years After 9/11, which respond to issues about the human condition.

== Early life and education ==
Helen C. Frederick was born in 1945 in Pottstown, Pennsylvania. Frederick received her BFA degree in Illustration (1967) and her Master of Fine Arts degree in painting (1969) from the Rhode Island School of Design, where she met German artist Dieter Roth, who introduced her to innovative printed media techniques.

Frederick's interest in paper as a medium began in 1976, when she visited Ahmedebad, India, where Robert Rauschenberg had completed a papermaking project. She continued her study of paper-making during travels to the Netherlands, Japan and China.

== Work ==
In 1981, she founded Pyramid Atlantic Art Center, a center for contemporary printmaking, hand papermaking and the art of the book, which she directed for twenty-eight years.

Since 1996, Frederick has taught printmaking and graduate studies at George Mason University's School of Art, where she serves as director of the department's imprint, Navigation Press.

Frederick specializes in hand-driven media such as custom-formed paper, artist's books, paintings, drawings, and prints, and she is recognized as the D.C. area's “most knowledgeable paper artist." Her work has also incorporated electronic media, video, digital prints, photography, “video books,” and sculpture.

Her video work “Dislocations” (2011) has been compared to Andy Warhol by curator Jeffry Cudlin; Critic Paul Ryan described her work in “Hungry Ghosts” (2011) as "drawing us closer to victims as they linger within the beyond – a liminal space conceptually akin to that described by post-colonial theorist Homi K. Bhabha as a physical space and occurrences where …there is a sense of disorientation, a disturbance of direction..an exploratory, restless movement….” Ryan also noted that "Hungry Ghosts" was influenced by Frederick's interest in Buddhist teachings and meditation practices.

In her 2010 solo exhibition, Dissonance at Hollins University’s Eleanor D. Wilson Art Museum, Frederick referenced the atomic bomb and the Cold War, themes that have often surfaced in her work. Her 1996 installation Caution: Appearance (Dis)appearance explored the significance of the atomic bomb fifty years after its first detonation. In this installation, Frederick, who was born shortly before the first testing of the atomic bomb, examined her own personal connection with the bomb and how it has impacted her life, as well as its implications for the natural world. She explored similar themes in her 1995 collaborative book with Bridget Lambert, Abracadabra, which used fifty images to “represent the 50 years of Frederick's life from 1945 to 1995.”

Frederick's Masse Ici, exhibited at Texann Ivy Fine Arts in 1998, “delve[d] deeply into issues of our technological age and the landscape of memory."

== Exhibitions ==
Major exhibitions of Frederick's work have been held at the Eleanor D. Wilson Museum at Hollins University (2011), Dieu Donne’ Gallery, New York (1996), Henie Onstad Museum, Norway (1979), Harvard's Fogg Museum (Davidson), and traveling museum exhibitions in Japan, Scandinavia, Europe, the United States and South America.

== Collections ==
Frederick's work is included in the Whitney Museum of Art in New York; the National Gallery of Art, Library of Congress, and the Smithsonian American Art Museum in Washington, D.C.; and many other national and international collections.

== Awards ==
Frederick has received numerous awards for her work, including a Fulbright (1973) and Mid-Atlantic Arts Award (1988), the Maryland Governor's Award for leadership in the Arts (2000) and the Southern Graphic Council Printmaker Emeritus Award, (2008). She was 2011 Frances Niederer Artist-in-Residence at Hollins University. She received the 2018 Distinguished Teaching Award of Distinction from the College Art Association (CAA).

== Bibliography ==
- The Arts of the Book, Clive Phillpot, The University of the Arts, Philadelphia, PA, 1988
- Ross, John; Romano, Clare; Ross, Tim (1989). Complete Printmaker: Techniques, Traditions, Innovations. Free Press. ISBN 9780029273715.
- Paper Art 4, Internationale der Papierkunst, Leopold Hoesch Museum, Duren, Germany, 1992
- Graphic Legacy, Susan Fisher Sterling, The National Museum for Woman in the Arts, 1995
- Evolving Forms/Emerging Faces, Jane Voorhees Zimmerli Art Museum, Rutgers, The State University of New Jersey, New Brunswick, New Jersey, 1997
- Dobke, Dirk (2004). Dieter Roth in America. Hamburg, Germany: Edition Hansjörg Mayer. ISBN 9780500976425.
- Printmaking: A Contemporary Perspective, Paul Coldwell, Black Dog Publishing, London, UK, 2010
- Helen Frederick, Eleanor D. Wilson Museum, Hollins University, Roanoke, VA, 2011.
