= Yuriko Yamaguchi (sculptor) =

Japanese-American sculptor (born 1948)

- Born: 1948 (age 77–78); Osaka, Japan
- Education: Princeton University
- Alma mater: University of California, Berkeley, University of Maryland, College Park
- Known for: sculpture
- Website: yurikoyamaguchi.com

Yuriko Yamaguchi (born 1948) is a Japanese-born American contemporary sculptor and printmaker. Using more natural mediums, she creates abstract designs that are used to reflect deeper symbolistic ideas. She currently resides near Washington, D.C..

== Early life and education ==
Yamaguchi was born in Osaka, Japan in 1948. Unable to speak English, she moved to the United States at the age of twenty-three and used art as an outlet for expression. It was at this time where she began to build sculptures which incorporated multiple mediums, including wood and wire. Such materials were used to symbolize delicacy and simplicity within Japanese culture – a life from which she gained much artistic inspiration.

She attended the University of California, Berkeley, graduating in 1974 with a BA degree. She went on to undertake directed study at Princeton University, and completed a Master of Fine Arts at University of Maryland, College Park in 1979.

== Career ==
She was Visiting Assistant Professor at George Washington University in the 2000s.

Over her career, her work had been seen through solo shows and public commissions. In this time, she has presented 50 solo shows, mainly located in Japan, California and Washington DC. A brief volume of work can be seen here through the following:

== Museum collections and public art ==
Whisper #2 (2023), National Museum of Women in the Arts, Washington, D.C.

- Hirshhorn Museum and Sculpture Garden, Smithsonian Institution, Washington, D.C.
- Philip Morris Art Collection, New York, N.Y.
- National Museum of Women in the Arts, Washington, D.C.
- Smith College Museum of Art, Northampton, MA
- Smithsonian American Art Museum, Washington, DC

=== Public art commissions ===
- SRI, Reston, Virginia, 2017
- Jewish Federation of Greater Washington, Rockville, MD, 2015
- Washington Dulles International Airport, Station A, “Wonder of Wonders” transferred from Bethesda, 2013
- Crowell & Moring, Washington, DC, 2012
- Harman Center for the Arts, Shakes Theater, Washington, DC, 2007
- Metalwork for South Corridor Light Rail Project, Charlotte, NC, 2007
- Wall Mural, consisting 8 patinated bronze form at the New Washington Convention Center, 2003
- Wall Mural; 14’x27′ consisting 28 patinated bronze forms at Concourse T, Hartsfield International Airport, Atlanta, Georgia. Commissioned by the City of Atlanta, Department of Aviation, GA, 1999
- Wall Mural; 9’x32′ consisting of 41 patinated bronze forms located at 7475 Wisconsin Avenue, Bethesda, MD, Sponsored by JBG Associates, 1998

== Solo exhibitions ==
- Addison/Ripley Fine Art, Washington, DC, 2021
- Werner Thoni Art Space, Barcelona, Spain, 2017
- Asia Society Texas Center, Houston, TX (Apr–Aug), 2016
- Figge Art Museum, Davenport, IA, 2015
- Adamson Gallery, Washington, DC, (Apr), 2014
- Howard Scott Gallery, New York, NY, 2011
- Towson University, Asian Gallery, Towson, MD, 2010
- Adamson Gallery, Washington, DC, 2009
- University of Maryland Gallery, College Park, MD (Sept–Dec), 2007
- Numark Gallery, Washington, DC (Nov), 2005
- Gallery NAF, Nagoya, Japan (Nov), 2004
- Koplin Gallery, Los Angeles, CA (Apr–Junes), 2002
- Emon Gallery, Japan (April), 2000
- Numark Gallery, Washington, DC, 1999
- Emon Gallery, Nagoya, Japan, 1997
- Baumgartner Galleries, Inc., Washington, DC, 1993
- Inax Gallery, Tokyo, Japan, 1992
- Koplin Gallery, Santa Monica, CA, 1991
- Penny Campbell, Newport Beach, CA, 1990
- SECCA (Southeastern Center for Contemporary Art), Winston-Salem, NC, 1986
- Washington Project for the Arts, Washington, DC, 1984
- Japanese Cultural Center, San Francisco, CA, 1975

== Awards and recognition ==
Yamaguchi has received recognition for her art. Many of her achievements are localized on the eastern coast of the United States or from Japanese organizations. Beginning in the 1980s, she has been awarded in every decade since, even continuing to this day. The following list is a summation of these awards:

- Werner Thoni Artspace Artists Residency, Barcelona, Spain, April–June, 2017
- Fairfax County Art Council Strauss Individual Grant, 2014
- Jentel Artist Residency Award, 2010
- Rockefeller Foundation Bellagio Center Artist Residency Award, 2009
- Myrthine & Louis Memorial Prize for Installation, the National Academy of Museum, NYC, 2008
- Finalist for Kreeger Museum Award, 2008
- American Academy of Arts and Letters Award, 2006
- Joan Mitchell Foundation Award, 2005
- Benesse Award (Japan), 2005
- Franz & Virginia Bader Foundation Grant, 2004
- Virginia Museum Professional Fellowship, 2001
- Virginia Commission of Arts Individual Grant, 2000
- Mid Atlantic/National Endowment for the Arts Regional Visual Arts Fellowship, 1995
- Virginia Commission of Arts Individual Grant, 1994
- Salzburg Kunstlerhaus Artist-Residency Grant, Virginia Center for Creative Arts, 1993
- Virginia Prize, 1990
- Virginia Museum Professional Fellowship, 1988
- Visual Arts Residency Grant, Mid Atlantic Arts Foundation, 1986
- Virginia Museum Professional Fellowship, 1985
- Fellowship, Virginia Center for Creative Arts, 1982
