= Robin Bennett Kanarek =

- Born: Robin Cheryl Bennett
- Education: Skidmore College; Pace University; Fairfield University
- Occupations: Nurse, philanthropist, author
- Children: 2

Robin Bennett Kanarek is an American nurse, philanthropist, and author who advocates for the use of palliative care for those with serious illnesses. A registered nurse since the late 1970s, Kanarek's work was inspired by her family's experience after her son was diagnosed with leukemia. In 2006, she co-founded the Kanarek Family Foundation, which has funded palliative care education and initiatives at institutions including Fairfield University, Memorial Sloan Kettering Cancer Center, and Yale University. She is the author of Living Well with a Serious Illness (2023).

== Early life and education ==
Robin Cheryl Bennett was born to Carl and Dorothy Bennett. She grew up in Stamford, Connecticut, where her father was the founder and president of the discount department store chain Caldor. She graduated from the Low-Heywood School.

Though initially accepted to Skidmore College to study art, she changed her major to nursing in 1975 before beginning her studies. She attended Skidmore College and later graduated from the Leinhard School of Nursing of Pace University. Kanarek later returned to school and earned a B.S.N. from Fairfield University's Marion Peckham Egan School of Nursing and Health Studies in 1996.

== Career ==
Kanarek began her nursing career at Stamford Hospital's cardiac unit and focused on chronic conditions such as heart disease and diabetes. By 1981, she was working as a diabetic educator at Century City Hospital in Los Angeles.

Following the death of her son, Kanarek's work turned toward philanthropy and advocacy for palliative care. In 2003, she co-authored a children's book, David's Treasure Tree, with Judith Casely. The following year, she established "David's Treasure Tree," a toy closet for pediatric patients at Stamford Hospital. In 2023, the original, painted doors from "David's Treasure Tree" at Stamford Hospital were relocated to the new Berkely Pediatric Ambulatory Center at Greenwich Hospital.

In 2006, she and her husband, Joseph, founded the Kanarek Family Foundation to improve the quality of life for those with serious illnesses through the promotion of palliative care. Kanarek serves as the foundation's president. Through her foundation, she has funded several initiatives. Her foundation's work includes a $350,000 donation to Fairfield University led to the 2008 dedication of the Robin Kanarek '96 Learning Resource Center, a simulation training facility for nursing students. She also began publishing articles about her family's experience, including a 2010 viewpoint piece in the American Journal of Nursing.

In 2017, the Kanarek Family Foundation provided funding to establish the Kanarek Center for Palliative Care at Fairfield University's Egan School of Nursing, a $1.5 million joint initiative with the university. She serves as the advisory chair for the center. The foundation has also supported educational programs at Memorial Sloan Kettering Cancer Center, Yale University, and George Washington University Institute for Spirituality and Health.

In 2023, the foundation funded Connecticut's first Pediatric Palliative Care Coalition, for which Kanarek is the sustainability coordinator. That same year, Johns Hopkins University Press published her book, Living Well with a Serious Illness: A Guide to Palliative Care for Mind, Body, and Spirit. Proceeds from the book are used to fund palliative care initiatives.

Kanarek serves on the boards of Fairfield University, Greenwich Hospital, and the Stamford Health Foundation. She chairs the advisory board for the Bennett Center for Judaic Studies at Fairfield University, which was founded by her parents. She is a fellow of the Royal Society of Medicine and received an honorary Doctor of Laws degree from Fairfield University in May 2025.

== Personal life ==
On December 6, 1981, she married Joseph Kanarek, a graduate of the Hebrew University of Jerusalem and a former captain in the Israeli Army, in a ceremony at Temple Agudath Sholom in Stamford. They have a son, David, who was diagnosed with leukemia in 1995 at the age of 10. David later died from complications related to his illness. As of 2023, Kanarek is a resident of Greenwich, Connecticut.
