= United States Senate Environment Subcommittee on Clean Air, Climate, and Nuclear Innovation and Safety =

U.S. Senate subcommittee

The U.S. Senate Environment and Public Works Subcommittee on Clean Air, Climate, and Nuclear Innovation and Safety is a subcommittee of the U.S. Senate Committee on Environment and Public Works.

== History ==
The subcommittee was formerly known as the Subcommittee on Clean Air, Climate Change, and Nuclear Safety, but was renamed during committee organization of the 110th Congress, after responsibility over global warming issues transferred to the Subcommittees on Public Sector Solutions and Subcommittee on Private Sector Solutions to Global Warming. The subcommittee still retains some inherent oversight over global warming issues due to its jurisdiction over the federal Clean Air Act.

== Jurisdiction ==
- Clean Air Issues
  - Environmental Protection Agency’s Office of Air and Radiation (OAR)
  - Clean Air Act
  - Indoor Air
  - Air pollution
- Nuclear Issues
  - Nuclear Regulatory Commission
  - Nuclear Plant Safety
  - Nonmilitary environmental regulation and control of nuclear energy
- Other issues
  - Tennessee Valley Authority

== Members, 119th Congress ==
| Majority | Minority |
|---|---|
| Cynthia Lummis, Wyoming, Chair; Kevin Cramer, North Dakota; John Curtis, Utah; Lindsey Graham, South Carolina; Pete Ricketts, Nebraska; Roger Wicker, Mississippi; John Boozman, Arkansas; Jon Husted, Ohio | Mark Kelly, Arizona, Ranking Member; Bernie Sanders, Vermont; Jeff Merkley, Oregon; Ed Markey, Massachusetts; Alex Padilla, California; Adam Schiff, California; Lisa Blunt Rochester, Delaware |
Ex officio
| Shelley Moore Capito, West Virginia | Sheldon Whitehouse, Rhode Island |

== Historical subcommittee rosters ==
=== 118th Congress ===
| Majority | Minority |
|---|---|
| Ed Markey, Massachusetts, Chair; Ben Cardin, Maryland; Bernie Sanders, Vermont; Sheldon Whitehouse, Rhode Island; Jeff Merkley, Oregon; Debbie Stabenow, Michigan; Alex Padilla, California | Pete Ricketts, Nebraska, Ranking Member; Kevin Cramer, North Dakota; Cynthia Lummis, Wyoming; Markwayne Mullin, Oklahoma; Roger Wicker, Mississippi; Dan Sullivan, Alaska; Lindsey Graham, South Carolina |
Ex officio
| Tom Carper, Delaware | Shelley Moore Capito, West Virginia |
