= Kevin Pierre-Louis =

American football player (born 1991)

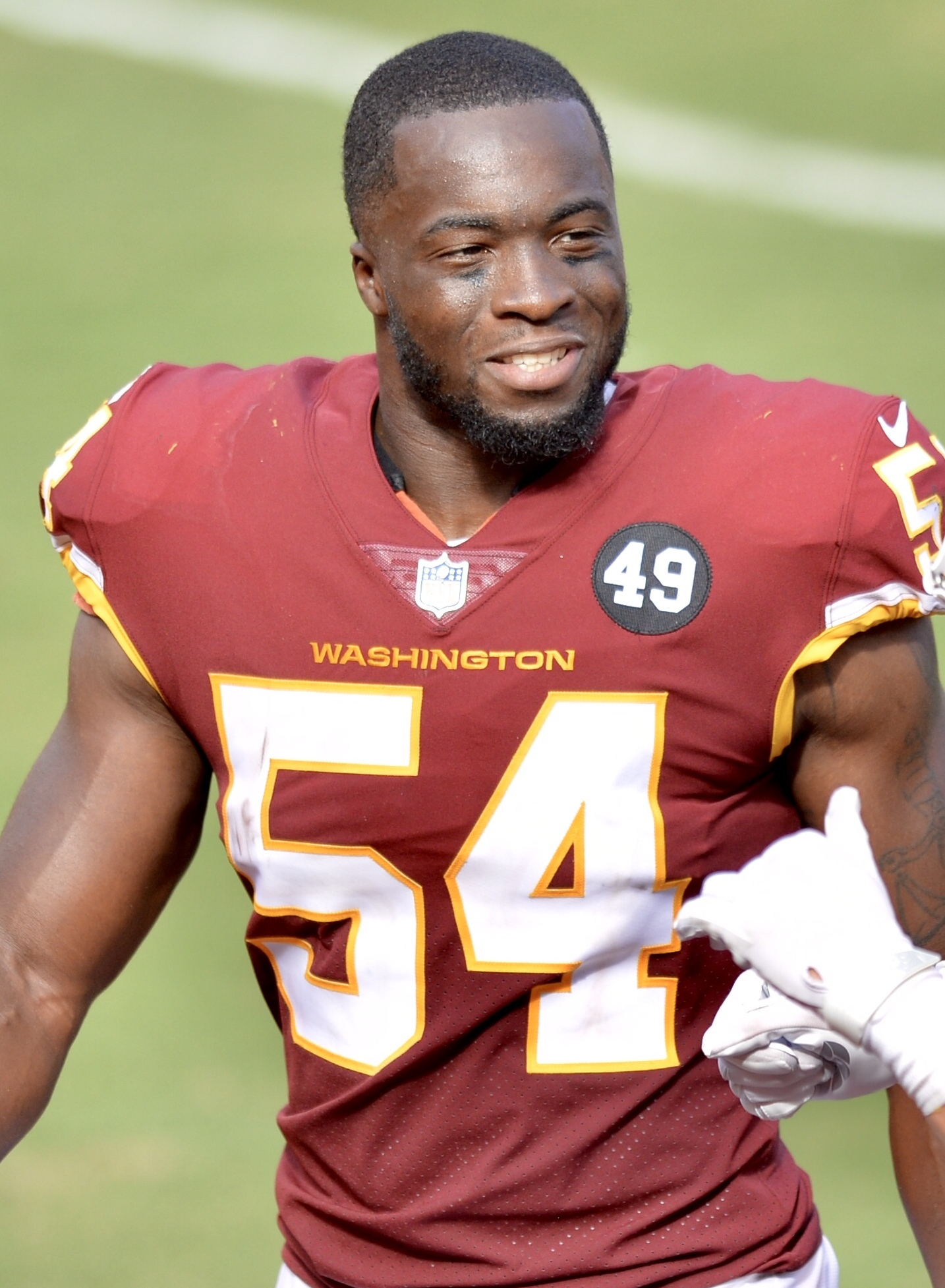
- Pierre-Louis with the Washington Football Team in 2020

No. 58, 57, 56, 54
- Position: Linebacker

Personal information
- Born: October 7, 1991 (age 35); Bridgeport, Connecticut, U.S.
- Listed height: 6 ft 0 in (1.83 m)
- Listed weight: 231 lb (105 kg)

Career information
- High school: King Low Heywood Thomas (Stamford, Connecticut)
- College: Boston College
- NFL draft: 2014: 4th round, 132nd overall pick

Career history
- Seattle Seahawks (2014–2016); Kansas City Chiefs (2017); New York Jets (2018); Chicago Bears (2019); Washington Football Team (2020); Houston Texans (2021–2022)

Awards and highlights
- First-team All-ACC (2013)

Career NFL statistics
- Total tackles: 198
- Sacks: 2
- Forced fumbles: 2
- Fumble recoveries: 2
- Pass deflections: 9
- Interceptions: 1
- Stats at Pro Football Reference

Kevin Pierre-Louis (born October 7, 1991) is an American former professional football player who was a linebacker in the National Football League (NFL). He played college football for the Boston College Eagles and was selected by the Seattle Seahawks in the fourth round of the 2014 NFL draft. He has also played for the Kansas City Chiefs, New York Jets, Chicago Bears, Washington Football Team and Houston Texans.

== Early life ==
Pierre-Louis attended King Low Heywood Thomas, a private, co-educational day school in Stamford, Connecticut, where he played middle linebacker and fullback. In 2009, he recorded 159 tackles in nine games, as well as three interceptions, returning two for touchdowns, two sacks, two forced fumbles and two fumble recoveries. Offensively, he rushed for 914 yards and 13 touchdowns on 77 carries. He was selected as the 2009-10 Gatorade Football Player of the Year for the state of Connecticut.

Considered a four-star recruit by Rivals.com, he was rated as the 10th best outside linebacker prospect of his class. He committed to Boston College over offers from Duke, Stanford, and Virginia.

== College career ==
Pierre-Louis attended Boston College from 2010 to 2013, where he played for the Eagles' football team. As a true freshman, he started in all 13 games, finishing second on the team with 93 tackles.

In 2011, he started the first nine games before missing the last three due to an injury. He still finished second on the team in tackles with 74, with seven tackles for loss, and returned a fumble 96 yards for a touchdown against UMass.

In 2012, he started nine games for the Eagles, finishing the season ranked fourth on the team with 85 tackles, including four for loss, two sacks and three pass breakups.

As a senior in 2013, he started all 13 games, setting new career highs in tackles (108), tackles for loss (10.5) and sacks (six). He also intercepted his first career pass, returning it 33 yards for a touchdown against Virginia Tech. After the season, he was named a first-team All-Atlantic Coast Conference (ACC).

== Professional career ==
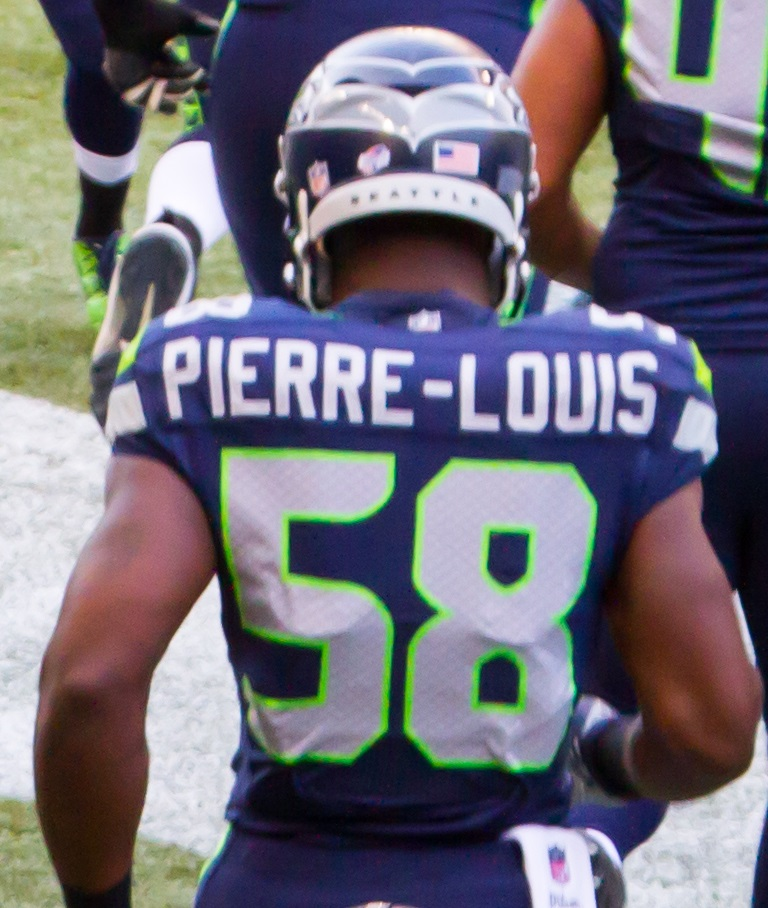
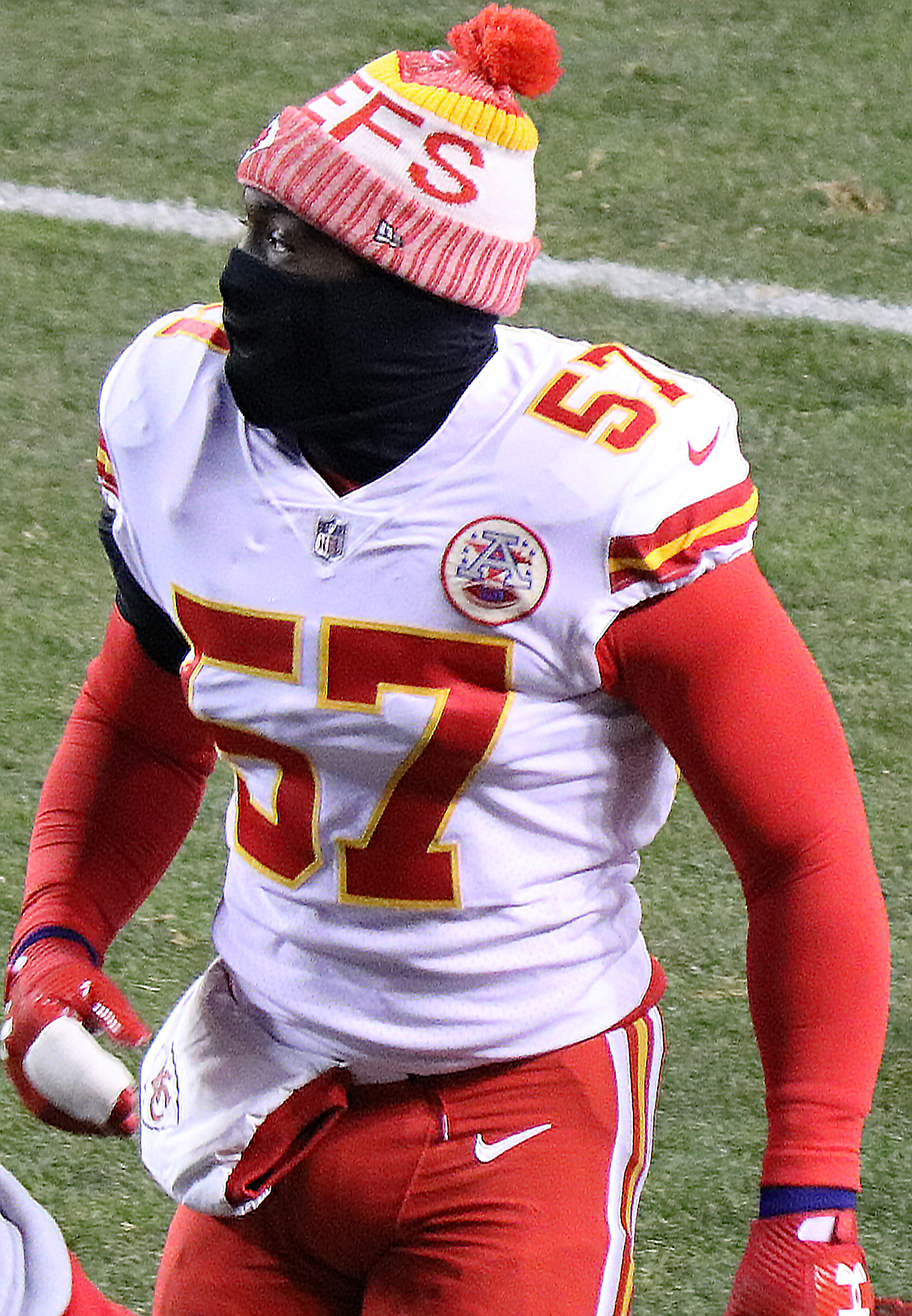
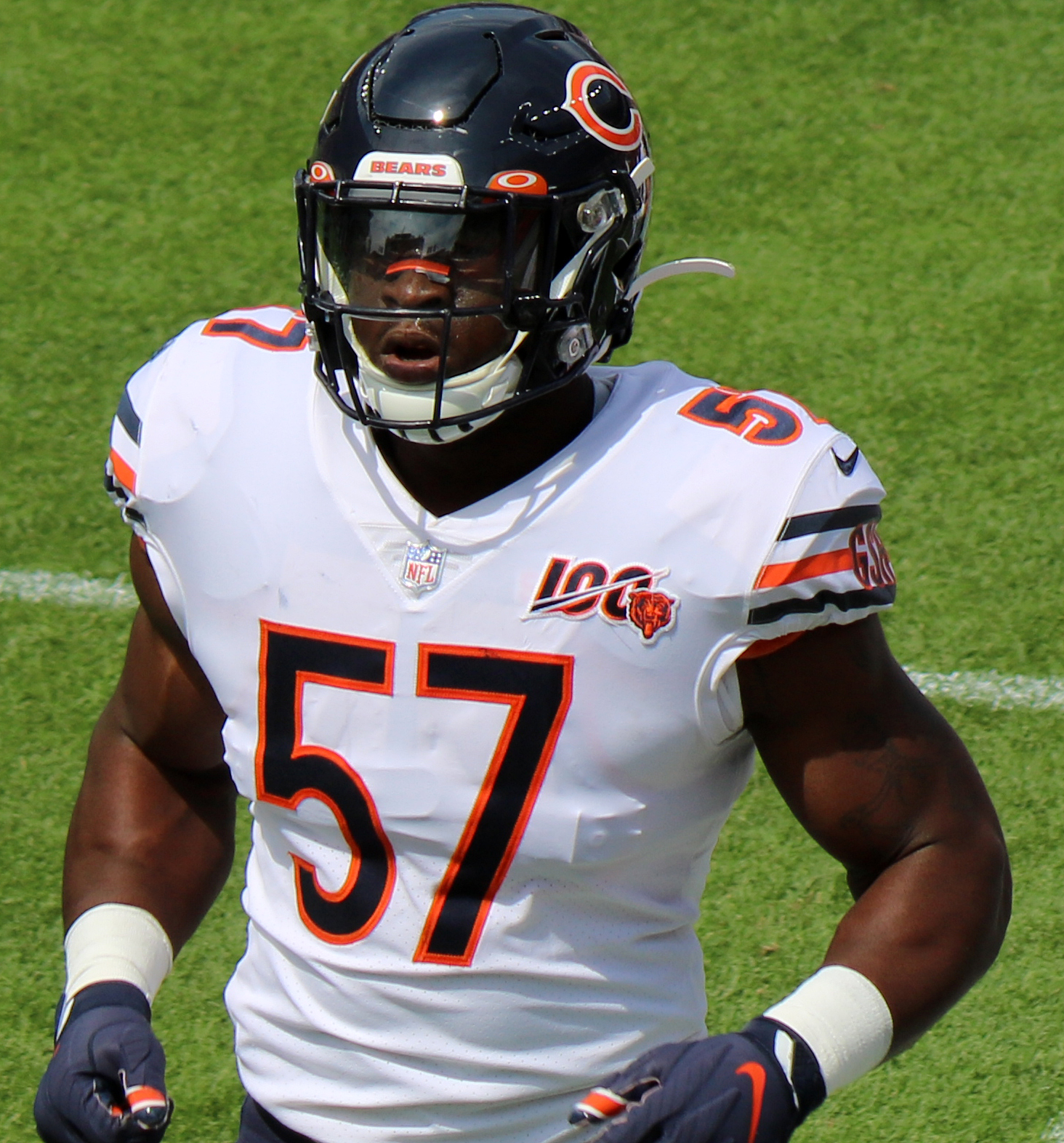
Pierre-Louis during his time with the Seattle Seahawks in 2014 (left), Kansas City Chiefs in 2017 (center) and Chicago Bears in 2019 (right)

Pre-draft measurables
Height	Weight	Arm length	Hand span	40-yard dash	20-yard shuttle	Three-cone drill	Vertical jump	Broad jump	Bench press
6 ft 0 1/2 in (1.84 m)	232 lb (105 kg)	32 1/4 in (0.82 m)	10 1/8 in (0.26 m)	4.51 s	4.02 s	6.92 s	39.0 in (0.99 m)	10 ft 8 in (3.25 m)	28 reps
All values from NFL Combine

=== Seattle Seahawks ===
Pierre-Louis was selected by the Seattle Seahawks in the fourth round (132nd overall) of the 2014 NFL draft. Pierre-Louis made his NFL debut on September 21, 2014, in an overtime win against the Denver Broncos where he recorded one tackle. Pierre-Louis was placed on season-ending injured reserve for a shoulder injury. He finished the season with 10 tackles in seven games.

=== Kansas City Chiefs ===
On July 28, 2017, Pierre-Louis was traded to the Kansas City Chiefs in exchange for D. J. Alexander.

=== New York Jets ===
On March 17, 2018, Pierre-Louis signed a two-year contract with the New York Jets. On August 11, Pierre-Louis was suspended the first game of the 2018 season for violating the NFL's Policy and Program for Substances of Abuse. He played in nine games before being placed on injured reserve on December 29. On February 19, 2019, the Jets declined the option on Pierre-Louis' contract, making him a free agent.

=== Chicago Bears ===
On May 8, 2019, Pierre-Louis signed a one-year contract with the Chicago Bears. In Week 16 against the Chiefs, Pierre-Louis recorded a team-high 12 tackles during the 26–3 loss. The following week against the Minnesota Vikings, Pierre-Louis recorded his first career interception off a pass thrown by quarterback Sean Mannion during a 21–19 win.

=== Washington Redskins / Football Team ===
Pierre-Louis signed a one-year contract with the Washington Redskins on March 31, 2020. The team's name was changed to the Washington Football Team later in the offseason.

=== Houston Texans ===
On March 16, 2021, Pierre-Louis signed a two-year contract worth up to $8 million with the Houston Texans. He was placed on injured reserve on September 16 with a hamstring injury. He was activated on October 23.

On August 30, 2022, Pierre-Louis was waived by the Texans and signed to the practice squad the next day. He was promoted to the active roster on September 10. He suffered a groin injury in Week 2 and was placed on injured reserve on September 20.

== NFL career statistics ==
Legend
**Bold**	Career high

=== Regular season ===
Year	Team	Games		Tackles					Interceptions					Fumbles			
Year	Team	GP	GS	Cmb	Solo	Ast	Sck	TFL	Int	Yds	TD	Lng	PD	FF	FR	Yds	TD
2014	SEA	7	0	13	10	3	0.0	1	0	0	0	0	0	0	**1**	0	0
2015	SEA	**14**	1	18	8	10	0.0	0	0	0	0	0	1	0	0	0	0
2016	SEA	13	0	12	7	5	0.0	0	0	0	0	0	0	0	0	0	0
2017	KAN	**14**	0	41	31	10	0.0	1	0	0	0	0	2	0	0	0	0
2018	NYJ	9	0	7	6	1	**1.0**	1	0	0	0	0	0	**1**	0	0	0
2019	CHI	**14**	3	37	27	10	0.0	2	**1**	**2**	0	**2**	**3**	0	0	0	0
2020	WAS	13	**11**	**56**	**36**	**20**	**1.0**	**3**	0	0	0	0	2	**1**	0	0	0
2021	HOU	9	1	10	8	2	0.0	0	0	0	0	0	0	0	**1**	0	0
2022	HOU	2	0	4	1	3	0.0	0	0	0	0	0	1	0	0	0	0
		95	16	198	134	64	2.0	8	1	2	0	2	9	2	2	0	0

=== Playoffs ===
Year	Team	Games		Tackles					Interceptions					Fumbles			
Year	Team	GP	GS	Cmb	Solo	Ast	Sck	TFL	Int	Yds	TD	Lng	PD	FF	FR	Yds	TD
2015	SEA	1	0	1	1	0	0.0	0	0	0	0	0	0	0	0	0	0
2016	SEA	**2**	0	0	0	0	0.0	0	0	0	0	0	0	0	0	0	0
2017	KAN	1	0	**6**	**4**	**2**	0.0	0	0	0	0	0	0	**1**	0	0	0
2020	WAS	1	0	1	0	1	0.0	0	0	0	0	0	0	0	0	0	0
		5	0	8	5	3	0.0	0	0	0	0	0	0	1	0	0	0

== Personal life ==
Pierre-Louis is of Haitian descent; his father is from Léogâne and his mother's family lives in Port-au-Prince. His family in Haiti run sugarcane plantations, ice factories, and rent out property.
