= Edward Townsend Howes =

American architect and artist

- Born: 1877; Brick Church, New Jersey, US
- Died: May 10, 1964 (aged 86–87); Stamford, Connecticut, US
- Education: Sheffield Scientific School; Massachusetts Institute of Technology; Pratt Institute; Ecole des Beaux-Arts; Académie Julian
- Occupation: Architect

Edward Townsend Howes (1877 – May 10, 1964), also known as E. Townsend Howes and Edward Howes, was an American architect and artist.

== Early life ==
Howes was born in Brick Church, New Jersey in 1877. His father was Charles Howes, a successful businessman in Stamford, Connecticut, where Howes spent most of his life. His uncle was the artist John Singer Sargent, who supported young Howes artistic talent.

Howes went to King School and, later, graduated from Westminster School. Howes attended the Sheffield Scientific School at Yale University, graduating in 1898. While at Yale, he was a member of St. Anthony Hall. He then attended the Massachusetts Institute of Technology.

In 1899, he attended the Eric Pape School of Art, coming in fourth place for life classes and earning a scholarship. He then studied at the Pratt Institute. Starting in 1900, he spent six years studying art in Paris, mostly at the Ecole des Beaux-Arts in Paris, France. He also studied with Jean-Paul Laurens at the Académie Julian in Paris.

== Career ==
Howes began his career as a watercolor artist. His best-known works depict life in Paris. He used a "broken-color technique, layering translucent washes" and often created asymmetrical compositions in the Impressionist style. Eight of his artworks are in the collection of the Smithsonian American Art Museum.

Later, Howe specialized in making architectural models. He created a scale model of the 1939 New York World's Fair. He also taught model-making to unemployed architects, artists, and draftsment as part of a Works Progress Administration program.

He became a licensed architect in New York City, New York state, and Connecticut. He designed mansions in Fairfield County, Connecticut and Long Island, New York especially in the Westbury and Shippan. He retired in 1949.

== Personal life ==
Howes married Elsie Waterbury Milligan of Elizabeth, New Jersey on June 1, 1912. They had a daughter, Elizabeth McKie Howes, and a son, Daniel H. Howes.

He was a member of St. John's Episcopal Church. He was the co-founder of the Digressionists Club in New York City for artists and architects. He was also a charter member of the Society of Architects and Artists.

Later in his life, Howes lived at 167 Fairview Avenue in the Shippan Point neighborhood of Stamford, Connecticut. Howes died on May 10, 1964, while in Stamford Hospital in Stamford at the age of 87 years. He was buried in Kensico Cemetery in Valhalla, New York.
