= King School =

Private school in Stamford, Connecticut, US

Location
- 1450 Newfield Avenue; Stamford, Connecticut 06905; United States; 41°06′40″N 73°32′04″W

Information
- Type: Private, Day
- Established: 1865 (161 years ago)
- CEEB code: 070720
- Head teacher: Carol Maoz
- Enrollment: 700 (PreK-12)
- Campus type: Suburban
- Colors: Navy, gold, and white
- Mascot: Viking
- Rival: Greenwich country day school
- Website: www.kingschoolct.org

King School, formerly King Low-Heywood Thomas, is a private coeducational day school for pre-kindergarten through grade 12 in Stamford, Connecticut, United States. King attracts students from 30 towns in the Fairfield County, Connecticut and Westchester County, New York areas. It operates as a 501c(3) non-profit institution and serves approximately 700 students.

== Campus ==
The King School's thirty-six acre campus is located on Newfield Ave. in northern Stamford, approximately forty miles from Manhattan. The campus consists of two historic buildings that house the lower and upper schools, a new middle school, and a new performing arts center. The new middle school building and performing arts center were completed in 2013.

In 2016, Campus sustainability efforts earned the school a nomination from the Connecticut State Department of Education to be considered one of the United States Department of Education's Green Ribbon Schools.

== History ==
King School has its origins in three different schools that merged over time to become the King Low-Heywood-Thomas School by 1988.

The Low-Heywood School, an all-girls school, was the oldest of the three. Low-Heywood was founded in 1883 when Louisa Low and Edith Heywood purchased the Richardson School that had existed on Willow Street in Stamford since 1865.

The King Day School, a boys' school, was founded by Hiram King and T. F. Leighton in Stamford in 1875 and first called The Collegiate School. By 1876, it had moved into the buildings of the defunct Wilcox Academy under the name H.U. King School for Boys. After moving its location several times, the King School purchased a property on Newfield Avenue in 1963. In 1969, the Low-Heywood school moved from Shippan Point to an adjacent property on Newfield Avenue.

The Thomas School, an all-girls school, was founded in 1922 by school teacher Mabel Thomas on the grounds of her family's estate following the death of her father. Thomas served as the school's headmistress until 1953. It merged with Low-Heywood in 1975, and became the Low-Heywood Thomas School girls' school.

The King School merged with the Low-Heywood Thomas School in 1988 to become the co-educational King & Low-Heywood Thomas school.

== Academics ==
King School is listed among the best private schools in the NYC suburbs.

The school offers multiple programs that allow for independent study and off-campus experiences. King's Advanced Science Program for Independent Research and Engineering focuses on research techniques in math and science and allows students to experience internships at university-based research labs.

== Athletics ==
King is part of the Fairchester Athletic Association (FAA), consisting of independent schools in Fairfield County, CT, Westchester County, NY, and of the Western New England Preparatory School Association (WNEPSA).

Notable past King athletes include:

- Nate Collins, a defensive end/nose guard most recently with the Chicago Bears
- Kevin Pierre-Louis, a linebacker with the Houston Texans
- Silas Redd, a running back most recently with the Washington Commanders
- Kenny Dyson, a linebacker most recently with the Carolina Panthers

=== Fall ===
- Boys' Football
- Boys' and Girls' Soccer
- Boys' and Girls' Cross country
- Girls' Volleyball
- Girls' Field hockey
- Coed Crew

=== Winter ===
- Boys' and Girls' Basketball
- Coed Hockey
- Coed Squash
- Coed Swimming
- Coed Crew

=== Spring ===
- Boys' and Girls' Tennis
- Boys' and Girls' Golf
- Boys' and Girls' Lacrosse
- Boys' and Girls' Track and field
- Girls' Softball
- Boys' Baseball

== Notable alumni ==
- Carter Burwell – (Class of 1973, King School), Primetime Emmy Winner and Academy Award Nominated composer
- Joe Carstairs – (c1911–1915, Low Heywood)
- Nate Collins – (Class of 2006, King Low Heywood Thomas), free agent NFL/CFL defensive end/nose guard
- Charli D'Amelio – social media influencer and singer
- Dixie D'Amelio – (Class of 2020, King School), social media influencer, singer, model and actress
- Kenny Dyson – (Class of 2019, King School), linebacker for the Carolina Panthers
- Robin Bennett Kanarek – nurse, philanthropist, and author
- Kevin Pierre-Louis – (Class of 2010, King Low Heywood Thomas), linebacker for the Houston Texans
- Silas Redd – (Class of 2010, King Low Heywood Thomas), retired NFL running back for the Washington Football Team
- Joy Reidenberg – (Class of 1979, Low Heywood Thomas), comparative anatomist and television personality
- Alexander Soros – (Class of 2004, King Low Heywood Thomas), non-profit executive and philanthropist
- Edward Townsend Howes – architect and artist

== See also ==
- Education in Stamford, Connecticut
