= United States Senate Environment and Public Works Subcommittee on Private Sector and Consumer Solutions to Global Warming and Wildlife Protection =

The United States Senate Environment and Public Works Subcommittee on Private Sector and Consumer Solutions to Global Warming and Wildlife Protection was one of six subcommittees of the Senate Committee on Environment and Public Works during the 110th Congress. The subcommittee's jurisdiction included:

- Global warming
- Fisheries and wildlife, including the Fish and Wildlife Service
- Endangered Species Act (ESA)
- National Wildlife Refuges

The subcommittee was formerly known as the Subcommittee on Fisheries, Wildlife, and Water, but was renamed during committee organization of the 110th Congress when global warming was added to its oversight responsibilities. It served as a counterpart to the new Subcommittee on Public Sector Solutions to Global Warming, Oversight, and Children's Health Protection.

The subcommittee was chaired by Senator Joe Lieberman of Connecticut, and the ranking member was Senator John Warner of Virginia.

== Members, 110th Congress ==
Majority
Member	State
Joe Lieberman, Chairman	Connecticut
Max Baucus	Montana
Frank Lautenberg	New Jersey
Bernie Sanders	Vermont
Barbara Boxer, ex officio	California

Minority
Member	State
John Warner, Ranking Member	Virginia
Johnny Isakson	Georgia
James M. Inhofe, ex officio	Oklahoma
