= Kenny Dyson =

American football player (born 2001)

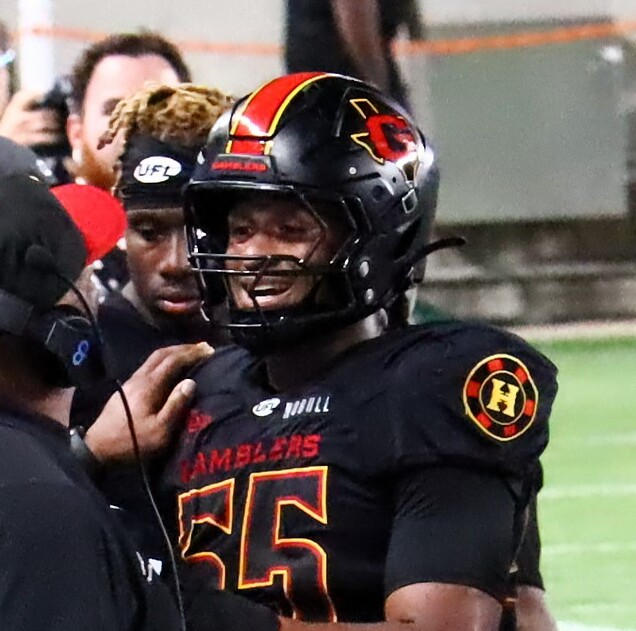
- Dyson with the Houston Gamblers in 2026

No. 54 – Minnesota Vikings
- Position: Outside linebacker
- Roster status: Practice squad

Personal information
- Born: June 27, 2001 (age 25); Stamford, Connecticut, U.S.
- Listed height: 6 ft 3 in (1.91 m)
- Listed weight: 235 lb (107 kg)

Career information
- High school: King (Stamford)
- College: Bryant (2019–2023)
- NFL draft: 2024: undrafted

Career history
- Carolina Panthers (2024); Houston Gamblers (2026); Minnesota Vikings (2026–present)*
- * Offseason or practice squad member only

Awards and highlights
- First-team All-Big South (2022); First-team All-Big South–OVC (2023); Second-team All-NEC (2021)

Career NFL statistics
- Total tackles: 2
- Stats at Pro Football Reference

Kenny Dyson Jr. (born June 27, 2001) is an American professional football outside linebacker for the Minnesota Vikings of the National Football League (NFL). He played college football for the Bryant Bulldogs and was signed by the Carolina Panthers as an undrafted free agent in 2024. He has also played for the Houston Gamblers of the United Football League (UFL).

== College career ==
During his five-year career at Bryant from 2019 through 2023, Dyson appeared in 44 games with 30 starts, where he totaled 104 tackles with 33.5 being for a loss, 24.5 sacks, six pass deflections, an interception, and three forced fumbles for the Bulldogs. He was named All-Northeast Conference (NEC) Second Team in 2021, All-Big South Conference First Team in 2022, and to the Big South-Ohio Valley Conference (OVC) First Team in 2023.

== Professional career ==
Pre-draft measurables
Height	Weight	Arm length	Hand span	Wingspan	40-yard dash	10-yard split	20-yard split	20-yard shuttle	Three-cone drill	Vertical jump	Broad jump	Bench press
6 ft 3 1/2 in (1.92 m)	244 lb (111 kg)	33 3/8 in (0.85 m)	9 3/8 in (0.24 m)	6 ft 7 1/2 in (2.02 m)	5.00 s	1.67 s	2.75 s	4.68 s	7.52 s	30.5 in (0.77 m)	9 ft 7 in (2.92 m)	23 reps
All values from Pro Day

=== Carolina Panthers ===
After not being selected in the 2024 NFL draft, Dyson signed with the Carolina Panthers as an undrafted free agent. He was released by the Panthers during final roster cuts on August 27, 2024, but signed to the team's practice squad the next day. On November 24, Dyson was elevated to the main roster, where he made his NFL debut the following day, playing eight total snaps versus the Kansas City Chiefs.

Dyson signed a reserve/future contract with the Panthers on January 6, 2025. On May 9, Dyson was waived by the Panthers.

=== Houston Gamblers ===
On February 7, 2026, Dyson signed with the Houston Gamblers of the United Football League (UFL).

=== Minnesota Vikings ===
Dyson was signed by the Minnesota Vikings on August 17, 2026. On August 30, he was waived with an injury designation by the Vikings as a part of the final roster cuts. On September 7, Dyson was re-signed to the practice squad. On September 9, the practice squad signing was disallowed by the league due to injury settlement rules and Dyson subsequently became a free agent. He was signed to the Vikings practice squad again on September 29.
