= Nate Collins =

American football player (born 1987)

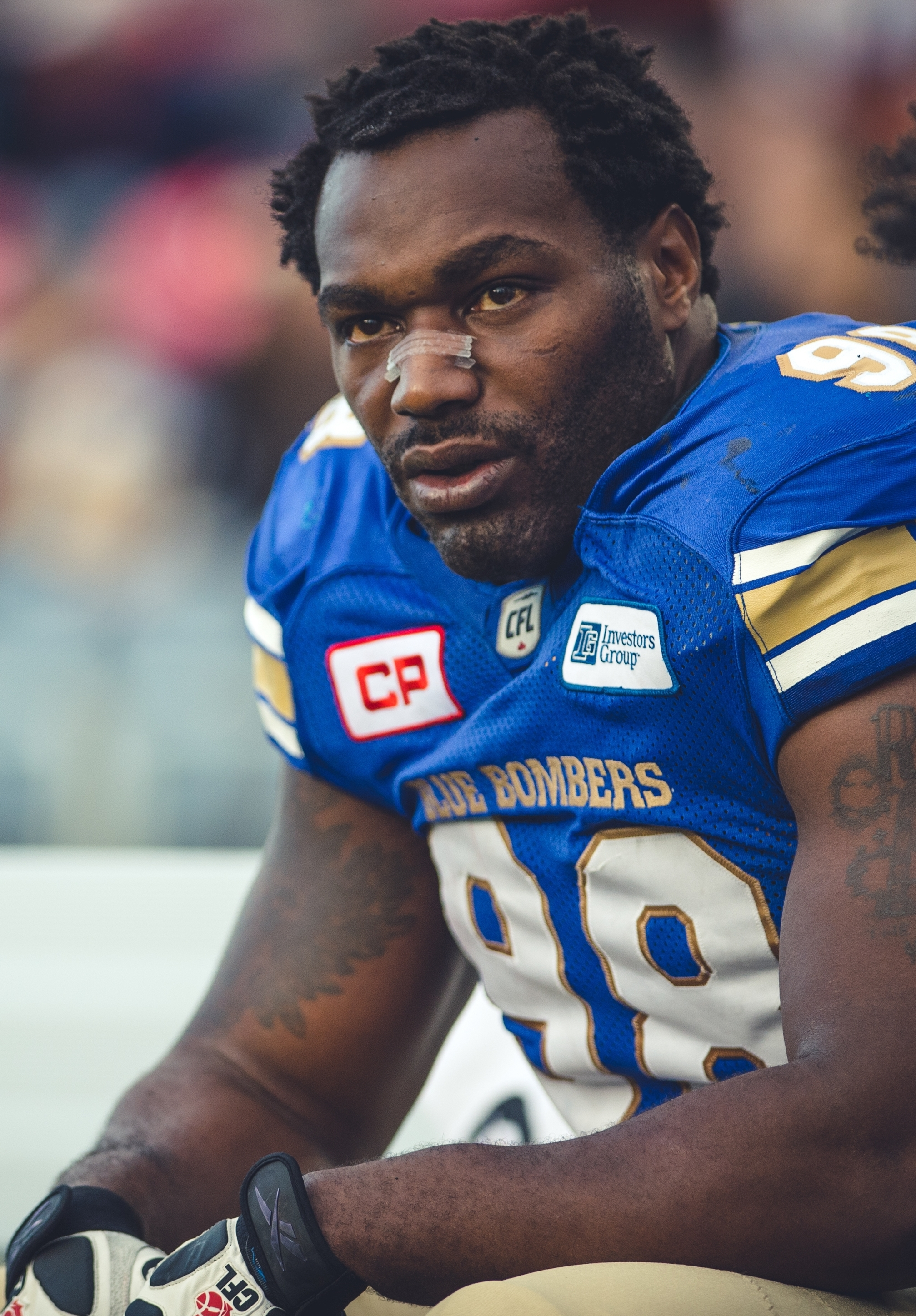
- Collins with the Winnipeg Blue Bombers in 2016

No. 98, 93
- Position: Defensive tackle

Personal information
- Born: December 14, 1987 (age 38); White Plains, New York, U.S.
- Listed height: 6 ft 2 in (1.88 m)
- Listed weight: 296 lb (134 kg)

Career information
- High school: King & Low-Heywood Thomas School (Stamford, Connecticut)
- College: Virginia
- NFL draft: 2010: undrafted

Career history
- New York Giants (2010)*; Jacksonville Jaguars (2010–2011); Chicago Bears (2012–2013); Winnipeg Blue Bombers (2015)
- * Offseason or practice squad member only

Awards and highlights
- First-team All-ACC (2009)

Career NFL statistics
- Total tackles: 35
- Sacks: 1.5
- Fumble recoveries: 1
- Total touchdowns: 1
- Stats at Pro Football Reference

Nathaniel Allen Collins (born December 14, 1987) is an American former professional football player who was a defensive tackle in the National Football League (NFL). He played college football for the Virginia Cavaliers and signed as an undrafted free agent with the New York Giants. He later played for the Jacksonville Jaguars and Chicago Bears

== Professional career ==
=== Jacksonville Jaguars ===
Collins was signed by the Jacksonville Jaguars on November 13, 2010. He played in one game in 2010 and 12 games during the 2011 season. He scored a touchdown in 2011 on a fumble recovery against the Tampa Bay Buccaneers. In February 2012, a Virginia state trooper arrested Collins and charged him with the possession of a small amount of marijuana. Less than a month later, the Jaguars rescinded the exclusive rights free agent tender placed on Collins, making him an unrestricted free agent, free to sign with any team.

=== Chicago Bears ===
Collins was signed by the Chicago Bears on May 23, 2012. On July 20, 2012, Collins was suspended for 1 game after violating the league's substance policy. In 2013, Collins was set to become a restricted free agent, though he was signed to a one-year deal on March 14. In week four against the New Orleans Saints, Collins tore his ACL, and missed the remainder of the season. Collins was placed on injured reserve on October 9. Two days before the start of the 2014 free agency period, Collins re-signed with the Bears on a one-year deal. The Bears released Collins on August 23, 2014.

=== Winnipeg Blue Bombers ===
Collins was signed as a free agent on April 10, 2015, by the Winnipeg Blue Bombers of the Canadian Football League. He played in five games, starting four, for the Blue Bombers in 2015. He was released on June 15, 2016.

== Personal life ==
Collins attended King Low Heywood Thomas in Stamford, Connecticut. He graduated from University of Virginia with a Bachelor of Arts in Psychology on May 20, 2012.

In April 2011, Collins and New York Giants receiver Victor Cruz started the clothing brand, Young Whales. The line, a play on words of a high-stakes casino gambler "whale", was ready for purchase online by September 2011.

After his football career ended, Collins became a professional podcaster, often being referred to as “Doctor Fax” on the Green Light podcast, with former Virginia teammate and two-time NFL Super Bowl Champion Chris Long serving as the show’s host.
