= Congregation Agudath Sholom =

Modern Orthodox synagogue and historic former synagogue in Stamford, Connecticut, US

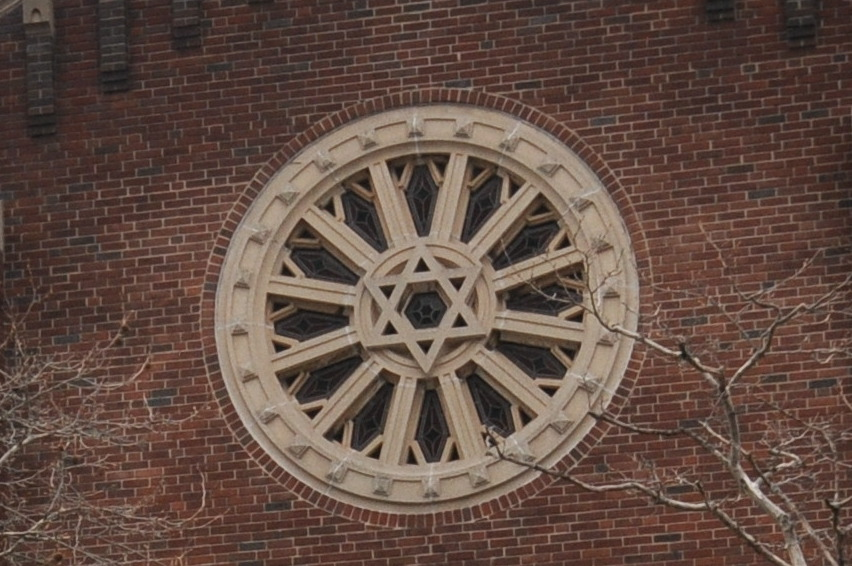

- Location of the current synagogue in Connecticut

Religion
- Affiliation: Modern Orthodox Judaism
- Ecclesiastical or organizational status: Synagogue
- Leadership: Rabbi Daniel Cohen; Rabbi Moshe Kurtz (Assistant)
- Status: Active

Location
- Location: 301 Strawberry Hill Avenue, Stamford, Connecticut 06902
- Country: United States
- Interactive map of Congregation Agudath Sholom
- Coordinates: 41°04′14″N 73°32′01″W

Architecture
- Type: Synagogue
- Style: Romanesque Revival (1941)
- Established: 1889 (as a congregation)
- Completed: 1908 (Greyrock); 1941 (Grove Street); 1965 (Strawberry Hill Ave.)

Website
- congregationagudathsholom.org
- Agudath Sholom Synagogue (former)
- U.S. National Register of Historic Places
- The former Agudath Sholom Synagogue, now Baptist church building with the original façade and Star of David in the rose window
- Location: 29 Grove Street, Stamford, Connecticut
- Coordinates: 41°3′18″N 73°32′1″W
- MPS: Historic Synagogues of Connecticut MPS
- NRHP reference No.: 95000561
- Added to NRHP: May 11, 1995

Congregation Agudath Sholom (transliterated from the Hebrew for "association (or guild) of peace") is a Modern Orthodox Jewish congregation and synagogue located at Strawberry Hill Avenue, in Stamford, Connecticut, in the United States.

The congregation's second building, at 29 Grove Street, was vacated in 1965 and subsequently converted into a Christian church, called the Faith Tabernacle Missionary Baptist Church. This former synagogue was added to the National Register of Historic Places in 1995 as part of a multiple property listing of fifteen historic synagogues in Connecticut.

== History ==
On September 7, 1889, twenty-two members formally declared themselves as "Agudath Sholom Synagogue," meaning "association of peace" or "guild of peace." The congregation constructed their first synagogue, the Greyrock Synagogue, from 1904 through 1908. The congregation used the building until February 1932 when the Greyrock Synagogue was destroyed in a fire.

=== Grove Street building ===
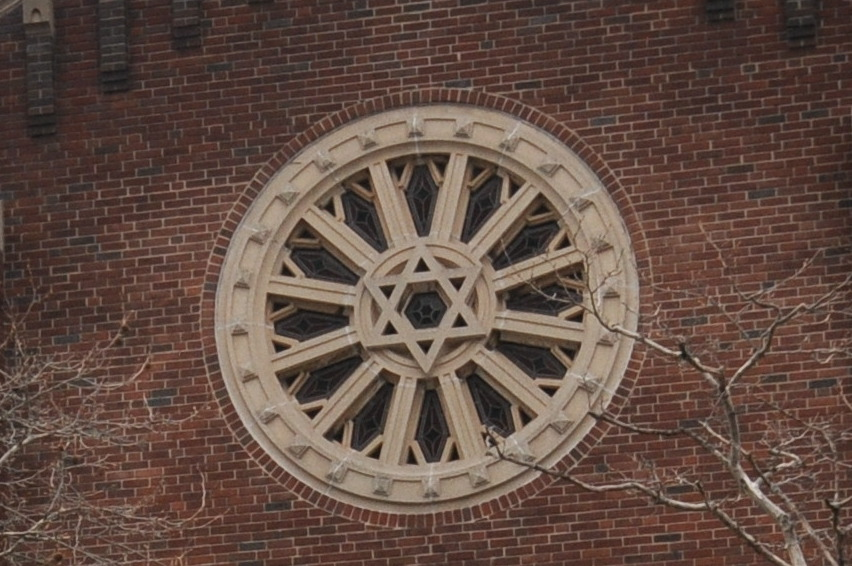
The Star of David window

Located at 29 Grove Street in Stamford, Connecticut, the Agudath Sholom Synagogue was the second synagogue of the congregation. The ground breaking occurred on September 12, 1933, and the final dedication was on April 27, 1941. (Note: According to the congregation's website, the Agudath Sholom Synagogue was completed in 1938 and the "Chanukkat Habayit dedication occurred on the High Holidays.") The construction delayed by funding difficulties that resulted from the Great Depression. The synagogue is a rectangular brick building constructed on a high basement. The building features a prominent rose window depicting the Star of David.

The Faith Tabernacle Missionary Baptist Church now uses the Grove Street synagogue.

=== Grove Street building significance ===
While it was originally a synagogue, the Faith Tabernacle Missionary Baptist Church continues to use the building as a church, however this did not impact the "National Landmark" status bestowed upon the building. For the National Register of Historic Places, it was submitted under Criterion C because it was "Constructed as a Jewish house of worship, located in an urban setting, exhibits integrity of design and workmanship and constructed prior to 1945."

The former Agudath Sholom Synagogue building on Grove Street was one of fifteen Connecticut synagogues added to the National Register of Historic Places in 1995 and 1996 in response to an unprecedented multiple submission, nominating nineteen synagogues.

=== Strawberry Hill Avenue building ===
In order to meet the demands of its growing congregation, funds were raised for a new synagogue; and in February 1963 it was announced that $860,000 had been raised, against a goal of $1.2 million. In 1965, the congregation completed and dedicated a new synagogue at 301 Strawberry Hill Avenue.

Senator Joe Lieberman's family were long-time members of Agudath Sholom, and his funeral was held there. He was buried in the congregation's cemetery, alongside his parents.

In April 2026, Rabbi Daniel Cohen announced that he was making aliya and would be leading a community in New Katamon, Jerusalem once the development was finished.

== See also ==
- National Register of Historic Places listings in Stamford, Connecticut
