= United States Senate Environment and Public Works Subcommittee on Public Sector Solutions to Global Warming, Oversight, and Children's Health Protection =

U.S. Senate subcommittee established 2007

The U.S. Senate Environment and Public Works Subcommittee on Public Sector Solutions to Global Warming, Oversight, Children's Health Protection was one of the six subcommittees of the U.S. Senate Committee on Environment and Public Works. Created in 2007, the subcommittee has general oversight jurisdiction over the U.S. Environmental Protection Agency as well as diverse issues such as global warming, children's health protection, and the National Environmental Policy Act (NEPA).

== Activities ==
In 2008, the subcommittee held hearings on the scientific basis of the Environmental Protection Agency's policies during the Bush administration.

== Members ==
=== 110th Congress ===
Membership during the subcommittee's inaugural year during the 110th United States Congress.

Majority
Member	State
Barbara Boxer, Chairwoman	California
Joe Lieberman	Connecticut
Thomas R. Carper	Delaware
Amy Klobuchar	Minnesota
Sheldon Whitehouse	Rhode Island

Minority
Member	State
Lamar Alexander, Ranking member	Tennessee
Larry Craig	Idaho
Kit Bond	Missouri
John Barrasso	Wyoming

== See also ==
- U.S. Climate Change Science Program
