= Rosh Pina (Washington, D.C.) =

Jewish congregation in the US

- Hebrew: ראש פינה
- Location in Washington, D.C.

Religion
- Affiliation: Modern Orthodox Judaism
- Rite: Unaffiliated
- Ecclesiastical or organizational status: Synagogue
- Status: Active

Location
- Location: Dupont Circle, Washington, D.C.
- Country: United States
- Interactive map of Rosh Pina
- Coordinates: 38°54′46″N 77°02′31″W

Architecture
- Established: 2007 (as a congregation)

Website
- roshpinadc.org

Rosh Pina (Hebrew: ראש פינה) is a lay-led Modern Orthodox Jewish congregation and synagogue that meets in the Dupont Circle neighborhood of Washington, D.C., in the United States.

The independent congregation meets for Shabbat morning services twice a month in the National Museum of American Jewish Military History (NMAJMH). It also meets occasionally for Friday night and holiday services, in addition to organizing social and educational events such as shabbatonim and parties to celebrate Hanukkah, Purim and other Jewish holidays.

== Overview ==
Rosh Pina describes it as "a dati community built around a common commitment to halakha, tefillah, and equality. It was founded in 2007 as a partnership minyan in order to provide a religious environment that was more inclusive of women's participation than traditional Orthodox synagogues.

== Services and liturgy ==
The congregation combines a traditional liturgy with certain prayer leadership opportunities for women, including Kabbalat Shabbat on Friday nights, Pesukei DeZimra, removing and replacing the Torah in the Ark, and reading from and being called up to the Torah on Saturday mornings. A mechitza separating men and women runs down the middle of the room. Its practices are similar to those of Shira Hadasha in Jerusalem and Darkhei Noam in New York City.

== Halakhic basis ==
The practices of Rosh Pina and communities like it are based on an opinion by Modern Orthodox Rabbi Mendel Shapiro, who holds B.A. and M.S. degrees from Yeshiva University and a J.D. from Columbia University, received his smikhah (rabbinic ordination) from Yeshiva University, and now practices law in Jerusalem. In his Halakhic analysis, entitled Qeri’at ha-Torah by Women: A Halakhic Analysis he calls upon those times throughout our history when women have received aliyot to (have been called up to) and have read from the Torah in communal services with men and women present, and carefully examines the circumstances in which this took place. His position and conclusions have subsequently been supported and expanded upon by Rabbi Dr Daniel Sperber, Professor of Talmud at Bar-Ilan University in his article entitled Congregational Dignity and Human Dignity: Women and Public Torah Reading. Sperber also delves into specific cases when Jewish law permitted and sometimes even required women to be called to and read from the Torah on Shabbat in services with men present. Like Shapiro, Sperber is not known as a Posek (decider of Jewish law) and this particular position of both of them is a minority view.

Rabbi Gil Student has weighed in against the practice, as have rabbis Aryeh Frimer and Dov Frimer, who wrote that "these practices are a radical break from the ritual of millennia and have not received the approval of any major posek."

== Governance ==
Rosh Pina has no rabbi or cantor. It runs through a lay committee known as the Vaad. In 2024, women held the majority. Rosh Pina works with DC Minyan and Kesher Israel on the Rabbi Philip Rabinowitz Memoria Eruv. This eruv covers the downtown Washington Jewish Community.

== See also ==
- Jewish Orthodox Feminist Alliance
- Jewish feminism
- Role of women in Judaism
