= Shira Hadasha =

Modern Orthodox Jewish congregation

Kehilat Shira Hadasha
- Hebrew: קהלת שירה חדשה
- Logo of the congregation

- Location of the synagogue in Jerusalem

Religion
- Affiliation: Modern Orthodox Judaism
- Rite: Partnership minyan
- Ecclesiastical or organizational status: Synagogue
- Status: Active

Location
- Location: 12 Emek Refaim, German Colony, Jerusalem
- Country: Israel
- Interactive map of Kehilat Shira Hadasha
- Coordinates: 31°45′58.17″N 35°13′18.03″E

Architecture
- Founder: Tova Hartman
- Established: 2002

Website
- shirahadasha.org/en/

Shira Hadasha (Hebrew: שירה חדשה, lit. 'New Song') is a Modern Orthodox Jewish congregation and Synagogue, located at 12 Emek Refaim, in the German Colony neighbourhood of Jerusalem, Israel. The congregation emphasizes a more expansive role for women in the synagogue. It was founded in 2002 by a group of local residents, including Tova Hartman. Shira Hadasha's prayer service format has been adopted by a number of congregations in Israel, the United States, Canada, Europe, and Australia.

== Practices ==
Shira Hadasha was the first Jewish congregation to implement the Halakhic opinions of Rabbis Mendel Shapiro and Daniel Sperber on the role of women in the synagogue.

The congregation combines a traditional liturgy with certain prayer leadership opportunities for women, including leading Kabbalat Shabbat, reciting Pesukei DeZimra, removing and replacing the Torah in the Ark, and reading the Torah on Saturday mornings. A mechitza separating men and women runs down the middle of the room. Parts of the service requiring a minyan do not begin until both 10 men and 10 women are present.

=== Criticism ===
A number of Orthodox rabbis have publicly disagreed with Shira Hadasha's mode of worship. Rabbi Yaakov Ariel, chief rabbi of Ramat Gan and a prominent religious Zionist rabbi, has ruled that "people should not pray in this synagogue". Rabbi Dov Lior of Kiryat Arba has stated that "anyone who is truly God-fearing will not join in such a minyan since this is how the breaking of Jewish tradition begins. Today they do this, and in the future the result will be women and men praying completely together."

Rabbi Gil Student has also weighed in against the practice, as have Rabbis Aryeh Frimer and Dov Frimer, who wrote that "these practices are a radical break from the ritual of millennia and have not received the approval of any major posek".

== See also ==
- Jewish feminism
- List of synagogues in Israel
- Role of women in Judaism
- Synagogues of Jerusalem
