= Minyan =

Quorum of ten Jewish adults for certain religious obligations

Halakhic texts relating to this article
- Torah: Leviticus 22:32
- Mishnah: Megillah 4:3
- Babylonian Talmud: Megillah 23b; Sanhedrin 74b
- Jerusalem Talmud: Megillah 4:4
- Mishneh Torah: Hilchot Tefillah 8:1
- Shulchan Aruch: Orach Chayim 55

In Judaism, a minyan (Hebrew: מניין \ מִנְיָן minyān [minˈjan], lit. (noun) count, number; pl. מניינים \ מִנְיָנִים minyānīm [minjaˈnim]) is the quorum of ten Jewish adults required for certain religious obligations. In all traditional orthodox practising Jewish religious movements, only men aged 13 years and older may constitute a minyan. The minimum of 10 Jews needed for a minyan has its origin (in part) in Abraham's prayer to God in Genesis 18:32. The minyan has additional roots in the judicial structure of ancient Israel as Moses first established it in Exodus 18:25 (i.e., the "rule of the 10s"). Cyrus Adler's and Lewis Naphtali Dembitz's entry for "Minyan" in the Jewish Encyclopedia states: "The minimum of ten is evidently a survival in the Synagogue from the much older institution in which ten heads of families made up the smallest political subdivision. In Ex. xviii. Moses, on the advice of Jethro, appoints chiefs of tens, as well as chiefs of fifties, of hundreds, and of thousands. In like manner there were the decurio among the Romans and the tithingman among the early English."

The most common activity requiring a minyan is public prayer. Accordingly, the term minyan in contemporary Judaism has taken on the secondary meaning of referring to a given prayer service, in general.

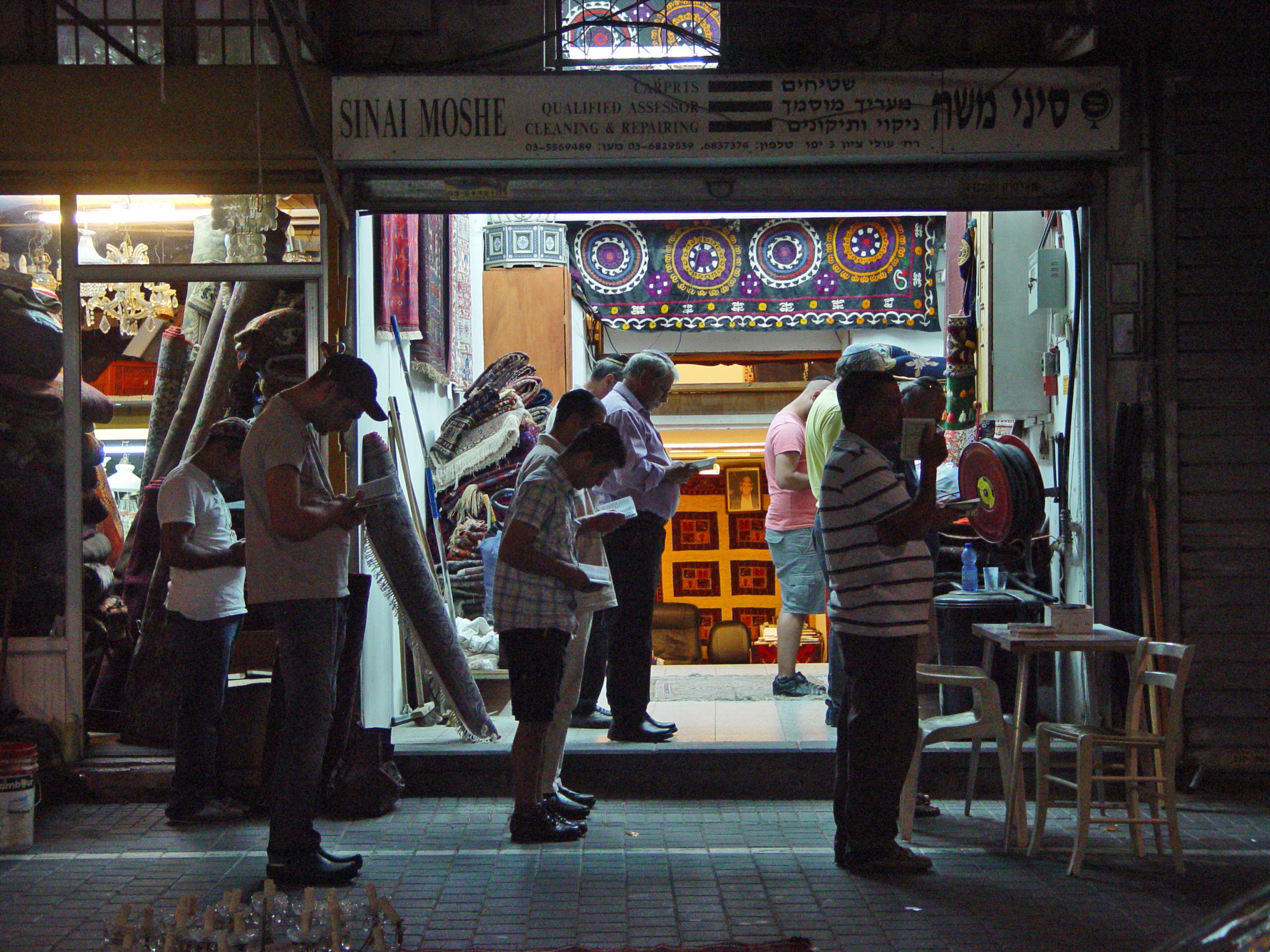
Minyan Ma'ariv prayer in a Jaffa Tel Aviv flea-market shop

== Sources ==
The source for the requirement of minyan is recorded in the Talmud. The word minyan itself comes from the Hebrew root maneh מנה meaning to count or to number. The word is related to the Aramaic word mene, numbered, appearing in the writing on the wall in Daniel 5:25.

Babylonian Talmud

The Babylonian Talmud (Megillah 23b) derives the requirement of a minyan of ten Jewish men who are shomer Shabbat for Kiddush Hashem and Devarim she-Bikdusha, "matters of sanctity", by using the rule of gezerah shavah to link three verses based on shared word-choice:

The word "midst" in the verse:

And I shall be sanctified in the midst of the children of Israel (Leviticus 22:32)

also appears in the verse:

Separate yourselves from the midst of the congregation (Numbers 16:21)

The term "congregation" is also used in another verse that describes the ten spies (of a total of twelve) who brought back a negative report of the Land of Israel:

How long shall I bear with this evil congregation which murmur against me? (Numbers 14:27)

From this combination, the Talmud concludes that "sanctification" should occur in the "midst" of a "congregation" of ten.

Jerusalem Talmud

The Jerusalem Talmud (Megillah 4:4) offers two sources for the requirement, also using a gezerah shavah:

The word "congregation" in the verse:

Speak to all the congregation of the children of Israel, and say to them: You shall be holy (Leviticus 19:2)

is also used in another verse:

How long shall I bear with this evil congregation which murmur against me? (Numbers 14:27)

Since the term "congregation" in the later verse refers to the ten spies, so too in the former verse: "You shall be holy" refers to a "congregation" of ten.

The second source is based on the term "children of Israel" which appears in the following two verses:

And I shall be sanctified in the midst of the children of Israel (Leviticus 22:32)

And the children of Israel came to buy among those that came (Genesis 42:5)

Just as the "children of Israel" in the later verse refers to the ten sons of Jacob who descended to Egypt to obtain food during the famine, so too the former verse refers to sanctification among the "children of Israel" in the presence of ten.

== Rituals requiring a minyan ==
Some rituals require a minyan; the presence of a rabbi (a teacher, not a priest) is not essential—it is said that "nine rabbis do not constitute a minyan, but ten cobblers can".

The following instances which require a minyan are listed in the Mishnah in Megillah (4:3):

- Public worship, which consists of the additional readings of Kaddish, Barechu, Kedusha and the Repetition of the Amidah. The minor tractate Soferim contains a passage (10:7) often interpreted as asserting that in the Land of Israel at that time seven men were allowed to hold public services, or that the repeating of "Kaddish" and "Barechu" at the synagogue for the benefit of late comers, and declares that in Israel such a repetition is permitted only when seven (according to others, when six) men are present who have not yet heard these responsive readings.
- The priestly blessing.
- Reading from the Torah and Prophets with the associated benedictions.
- Seven benedictions recited at a wedding, or at any meal of the bridegroom and bride within a week from the wedding. However, the last blessing (asher barah) may be recited in the presence of three men.
- Using the formulation "Let us bless our God, from whose wealth we have eaten," in preparing for Grace after meals.
- Ancient funeral ceremonies, no longer in use, which incorporated arranging the standing and sitting, reciting the benedictions of the mourners and the consolation of the mourners.

Other instances which require the presence of a minyan include:

- Recitation of the Thirteen Attributes of Mercy
- Recitation of Birkat ha-Gomel.

While the required quorum for most activities requiring a quorum is usually ten, it is not always so. For example, the Passover sacrifice or Korban Pesach (from the days of the Temple in Jerusalem) must be offered before a quorum of 30. (It must be performed in front of kahal adat yisrael, the assembly of the congregation of Israel. Ten are needed for the assembly, ten for the congregation, and ten for Israel.) According to some Talmudic authorities, women counted in the quorum of 30 for offering the Korban Pesach (e.g. Rav, Rav Kahana, Pesachim 79b).

== Prayer with a minyan ==
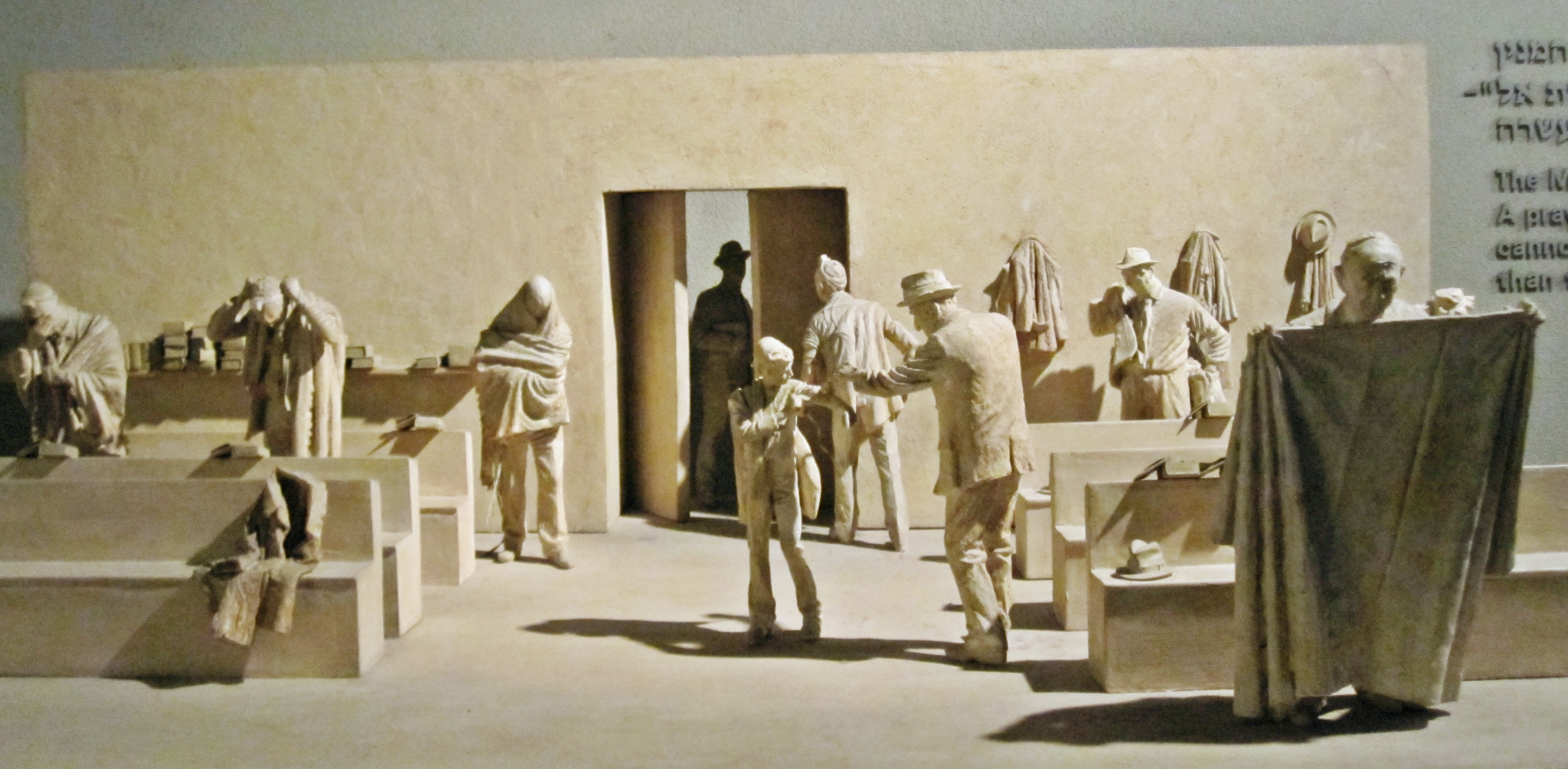
An exhibit at the Anu – Museum of the Jewish People shows a group of Jews waiting for the tenth man

It was the firm belief of the sages that wherever ten Israelites are assembled, either for worship or for the study of the Law, the Divine Presence dwells among them. In rabbinical literature, those who meet for study or prayer in smaller groups, even one who meditates or prays alone, are to be praised. However, the stress is put upon the merits and sacredness of the minyan of ten. The codifiers, such as Maimonides, his annotators, and the author of the Shulkhan Arukh, have unitedly given strength to this sentiment, and have thus, for more than a thousand years, made the daily attendance at public worship, morning and evening, to be conducted with a quorum of ten.

There is a disagreement between the medieval commentators on whether prayer with a minyan is preferable or obligatory. Rashi is of the view that an individual is obligated to pray with a minyan, while Nahmanides holds that only if ten adult males are present are they obliged to recite their prayer together, but an individual is not required to seek out a minyan.

Rashi and the Tosafot are both of the opinion that one is required to travel the distance of 4 mil to pray with a minyan (contemporary authorities differ as to whether this is a distance or a time that it would have taken to travel this distance and with modern technology one would need to travel a lot further). The Mishnah Berurah writes that one who is sitting at home must travel up to one mil.

== Eligibility ==
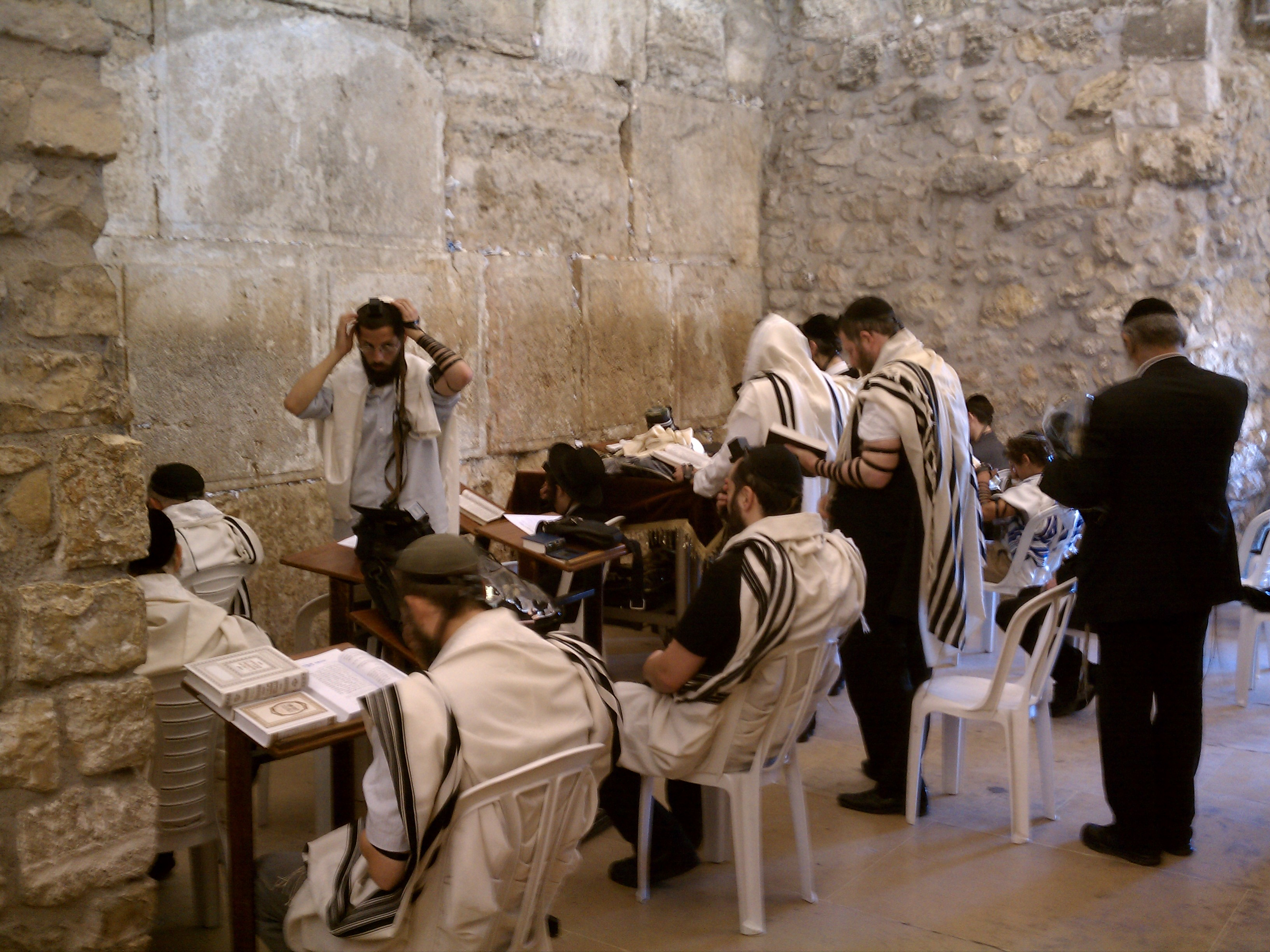
A minyan held at the Western Wall in Israel.

There is much discussion in rabbinic literature on the matter of who is eligible to be counted in a minyan. Some discussions revolve around whether or not a minyan should consist of individuals who are obligated in performance of that particular precept. Some authorities deduce who may constitute a minyan by drawing on the verses which are brought as the basis for minyan and their implication. For example, the verse, "How long shall I bear with this evil congregation which murmur against me?" is referring to the ten spies, a congregation comprising Jewish adult males. It is understood from this that a minyan must likewise comprise ten Jewish adult males. Other classical sources base their rulings on discussions brought in the Talmud. Contemporary rabbinical authorities deal with a plethora of questions relating to qualification for minyan.

=== Minors ===
Before a boy turns thirteen, he is considered a minor in Jewish law and is not obligated in the performance of religious precepts. However, if a child is over six years of age and has adequate comprehension of the significance of the precepts, his status may change. His inclusion in minyan is thus subject of Talmudic dispute. Based on the Talmudic passage in Berachot, Rabbeinu Tam states that a minor can act as the tenth person and according to the Baal Ha-Maor, up to four minors would be permitted. Rosh explains that those who permit the inclusion of a minor maintain that it is the Divine Presence which actually constitutes the tenth member, thereby validating the minyan — this may explain why some of these authorities require that the minor represent this fact by holding a chumash. However the majority of poskim follow the conclusion of the Ri who holds that a minor can never be counted in a minyan under any circumstances. This is the stance taken by the Shulchan Aruch, who, although acknowledging some authorities do permit the inclusion of an astute six-year-old, writes that consensus rejects this view and only males over the age of thirteen may constitute a minyan. However, in extraordinary circumstances some are lenient and permit a minor over six years old holding a chumash or Sefer Torah to complete a minyan. Rabbi Moshe Feinstein says that we can rely on this because most of the laws of Minyan are Rabbinical in nature (except for the laws of Kiddush Hashem), so one can conclude that when dealing with a Biblical law of Minyan (such as Sanctifying God's name in public) one would not be able to count a child.

=== Women ===
Although the issue of whether women are permitted to make up a minyan has been noted in early works, the matter has only come to the fore in the past few decades, a reaction to an enhanced role of women in modern society and to the demand for their inclusion in all areas of religious life.

The Talmud itself does not directly address the question of whether women may count as part of a minyan for devarim shebkdusha. Since the Talmud uses the same gezerah shavah for Kiddush Hashem as it uses for devarim shebkdusha, one may expect the laws for those two cases to be the same. Many authorities are of the opinion that women are included in the minyan for Kiddush Hashem and Hillul Hashem. However, traditional codifiers generally do not include women in the minyan for devarim shebkdusha.

The Talmud (Arakhin 3a) relates that women are required to recite zimmun of three participants, and Berakhot 45 says that women may recite the zimmun. However, the majority of scholars are of the opinion that ten women may not recite the additional form of zimun be-Shem, which is obligatory when ten men are present. The few authorities who do permit ten women to use the zimmun be-Shem formulation explain that the necessity for ten in this case is unique and cannot be compared to other instances requiring minyan. Only Rabbeinu Simcha among these authorities mentions the possibility of one woman's joining with nine men to form a minyan for prayer. This isolated opinion is rejected by the codifiers. There are a number of cases, including reading of the megillah, where a limited number of authorities count women towards the minyan. However, in these cases the reason why women are counted is not because they constitute a "congregation," but rather because a public audience is required.

A possible reason why it is men who were obligated to form a congregation in order to convene the Divine Presence is that women were individually considered sufficiently holy and did not require the combination of a group and special prayers to achieve added holiness deficient in men. Due to the righteousness of the women in the wilderness, they did not suffer the same deadly fate as their male counterparts, and despite the spies' negative report about the holy land, wished to enter it. Others point to the sociological reality that women were traditionally expected to care for the house and children. The Jewish tradition did not require women to leave their social role to engage in public prayer.

==== Reform ====
In 1845, rabbis attending the Frankfort Synod of the emerging Reform Judaism declared that women count in a minyan, a formalization of a customary Reform practice dating back to 1811.

==== Conservative ====
In 1973, the Committee on Jewish Law and Standards of Conservative Judaism voted to count men and women equally as members of a minyan. In 2002, the Committee adapted a responsum by Rabbi David Fine which provides an official religious-law foundation for women counting in a minyan and explains the current Conservative approach to the role of women in prayer. This responsum holds that, although Jewish women do not traditionally have the same obligations as men, Conservative women have, as a collective whole, voluntarily undertaken them. Because of this collective undertaking, the Fine responsum holds that Conservative women are eligible to serve as agents and decision-makers for others. The responsum also holds that traditionally-minded communities and individual women can opt out without being regarded by the Conservative movement as sinning. By adopting this responsum, the CJLS found itself in a position to provide a considered Jewish-law justification for its egalitarian practices, without having to rely on potentially unconvincing arguments, undermine the religious importance of community and clergy, ask individual women intrusive questions, repudiate the halakhic tradition, or label women following traditional practices as sinners.

=== Transgressors ===
The question of whether a sinner can be counted for a minyan has become much more pertinent in recent generations, where a general malaise in religious observance among the majority of Jews has occurred. The Shulchan Aruch states that though a person may be a notorious and habitual sinner and has even committed a capital offense unless a person has been placed under a religious ban due to his sinful behavior, he is counted among the ten. The source provided for this sentiment is from the incident with Achan who, despite having been put to death for his transgression, was still referred to as a Jew. However, the Pri Megadim explains that this is only true if he sins for self-satisfaction, but if a person sins to spite God or has openly severed their connection with the Jewish people by professing a hostile creed or by publicly desecrating the Shabbat, such a person is prohibited from constituting a minyan. Nevertheless, many contemporary authorities have been driven to adopt a lenient view in the face of widespread public non-observance of the Shabbat, on the presumption that it does not indicate a deliberate denial of faith, but is rather a result of ignorance and succumbing to the pressure of social and economic conditions.

=== Proselytes ===
Even though Tosafot deduce from the Talmud in Sukkah 38b that wherever the verse states "children of Israel" it comes to exclude a proselyte unless there is specific clause for inclusion, here with regard to minyan the sources state that there is no reasoning to exclude a full-fledged proselyte. Since such a person is permitted to act as a prayer leader, obviously they can count towards a minyan.

=== Those who are unable to respond ===
As long as a person is of sufficient intelligence, he can be included in the minyan, even if he is unable to respond to the prayers which make the presence of ten a necessity. According to some sources, this is because as long as ten are gathered the Divine Presence descends and it is feasible to pronounce a Dvar she'bekedusha. This includes someone who is in the middle of his prayers but is precluded from responding to the hazzan's incantations and someone who is mute but can hear the prayers — someone who is deaf but has the ability and knows when to respond can also be included. There is however a dispute regarding someone who is asleep or intoxicated. Such a person has sufficient intelligence, but at present can neither hear or respond. Ideally he should be woken to the extent that he is dozing, but in extraneous circumstances where it impossible to arouse him, it is permitted to include the maximum of one sleeping person in the minyan. In the case of a drunkard, the accepted view is that even if he has not reached the "drunkenness of Lot", he still cannot be included. A minimum of six of those gathered in the minyan have a duty to listen attentively and respond appropriately to the additional prayers and that at least nine are required to respond for the repetition of the Amidah.

== Arrangement ==
It is not just the status of the individual which dictates eligibility; the physical arrangement of the minyan is also a factor. Maimonides delineates the confines which are placed on the arrangement of the people making up a minyan. Ideally all the members of the minyan should be gathered in one room. However, if they are within hearing distance of one another, it is permitted for the ten to be distributed in two adjoining rooms. Later authorities limit the extent of this opinion and rule that even if there is an opening between the two rooms, the two groups are still considered separate entities. Only in unusual circumstances is it permitted, as long as some of the men in each room can see each other.

== Ten-and-ten minyan (ten men and ten women) ==
Over the last decade or so, some very liberal Modern Orthodox communities have formed an attempt to combine commitment to traditional Jewish law with a push for increased participation and recognition of the role of women. While many are simply referred to as independent minyanim, the term used by the Jewish Orthodox Feminist Alliance for those groups that consider themselves part of the Modern Orthodox community is partnership minyan. Many of these groups have adopted the custom initially instituted by Shira Hadasha in Jerusalem to wait for a "ten-and-ten minyan", made up of ten men and ten women.

Shira Hadasha has based many of its decisions on the writings of rabbis like Mendel Shapiro and Daniel Sperber. Some also use the Guide for the Halakhic Minyan, a compendium of halakhic sources supporting increased participation by women in services, as a basis for discussions of practices like the ten-and-ten minyan.

== See also ==
- Birkat HaMazon
- "Minyan Man"
- The Tenth Man
- Torah reading
- Tzadikim Nistarim

== Bibliography ==
- Pheufer, A Y (1997), Ishei Yisrael – The Laws of Prayer, Jerusalem: Nishmat Aharon ve-Yaakov Institute
