= Conservative Judaism and homosexuality =

Homosexuality has been a pivotal issue for Conservative Judaism since the 1980s. A major Jewish denomination in the U.S., Conservative Judaism has wrestled with homosexuality and bisexuality as a matter of Jewish law and institutional policy. As with other branches of Judaism debating the acceptability of same-sex sexual expression, Conservative Jews faced both long-standing rabbinic prohibitions on same-sex sexual intimacy as well as increasing demands for change in the movement's policies toward gay, bisexual, and lesbian people. Previously, the Conservative movement had changed its policies toward women, for example, by allowing the ordination of women as rabbis in 1983. Similarly, the Conservative leadership has been asked to stop discriminating against gay, bisexual, and lesbian people. This goal has been partially completed with the approval of the ordination of gay, bisexual, and lesbian rabbis in 2006 and of same-sex marriage ceremonies under Jewish law in 2012. However, the Conservative decision did not call same-sex marriages kiddushin, the traditional Jewish legal term for marriage, because that act of consecration is non-egalitarian and gender-specific. In the conventional kiddushin ceremony, a pair of blessings is recited and the bridegroom gives his bride a ring, proclaiming that he is marrying his bride “according to the laws of Moses and Israel.”.

== Conservative Halakha on sexual orientation ==
In Conservative Judaism, the Committee on Jewish Law and Standards (CJLS) of the Rabbinical Assembly makes the movement's decisions concerning Jewish law. The CJLS consistently refused to pass several proposed takkanot concerning the Levitical prohibitions on male-male anal sex, but also on all forms of homosexual intimacy, in general. In 1992, the CJLS action affirmed its traditional prohibition on homosexual conduct, blessing same-sex unions, and ordaining openly gay, bisexual, and lesbian clergy. However, these prohibitions grew increasingly controversial within the Conservative movement. Regarding ordination, a major criticism of the ordination of LGBTQ individuals is that interpretations of Jewish law prohibit gay sex, and rabbis are held as examples of following Jewish law.

A variety of liberal proposals had been brought forth in the non-Orthodox community, including some by Rabbinical Assembly rabbis. Some argued that a change in Jewish understanding and law on this issue must take place due to new information about the biology and genetics concerning human sexuality. Others argued that a change was required solely on ethical grounds. The CJLS accepted no such papers, as Conservative Judaism sees itself as bound by halakhah.

However, these arguments were soon expanded upon within more formal halakhic responsa, one of the most prominent by Rabbi Bradley Shavit Artson. He used historical, sociological, and ethical considerations to argue that homosexuality, as it is now understood today, was not described by the Torah or understood by traditional rabbis. As such, one could restrict the understanding of the Torah prohibition to cases not being considered today. His views were considered important, but they were not accepted by themselves as halakhically convincing. A few years later, Rabbi Elliot N. Dorff used these arguments in his case for re-evaluating Conservative Judaism's stand on sexual orientation but held that Artson's paper was insufficiently halakhically rigorous. Dorff studied the issue of coercion, arguing that people who were innately homosexual due to biology were not to be regarded as sinning. His early papers on the subject began to gain acceptance among a minority of RA rabbis, but ultimately, it was made clear that the CJLS would not accept this argument as sufficient.

Two additional papers, one by Rabbi Gordon Tucker and one by Rabbis Myron Geller, Robert Fine, and David Fine, went further than Dorff's paper. Tucker's paper stated that it is necessary to expand the definition of the halakhic process, and the Geller, Fine, and Fine paper redefined the corpus of Halakha as representing the evolving beliefs and ideals of the Jewish people of a particular time and place as distinct from representing an infallible Divine will. While both papers had the support of at least 6 members, a majority of the CJLS found that both papers represented so extensive a change that they could not be accepted as mere changes of Jewish law, but each should be regarded as a Takkanah that would uproot a Torah prohibition if passed. Under the CJLS rules, once a majority of the committee found a responsum to be a Takkanah, accepting it would require a majority of the Committee (13 of 25 votes), while an ordinary responsum could be accepted as a valid alternative with as few as 6 of 25 votes.

On December 6, 2006, the Committee on Jewish Law and Standards adopted diametrically opposed responsa on the issue of sexual orientation. The CJLS's action permits each congregational rabbi and rabbinical school to decide which responsum to adopt, hence setting its own policy on the subject. The adoption of dual, contradictory responsa represents a straddling of the contemporary societal divide over sexual matters. It also represents a sharp change from previous Conservative policy, which in 1993 had adopted a consensus position reaffirming a blanket prohibition on homosexual conduct while welcoming gay, bisexual, and lesbian people as members.

=== The Dorff, Nevins, and Reisner responsum ===
One responsum, by Rabbis Elliot N. Dorff, Daniel Nevins, and Avram Reisner, reduced the extent of traditional restrictions and substantially changed Conservative views on homosexual conduct. It characterized most such restrictions as rabbinic in character. It found rabbinic restrictions subject to reconsideration by the CJLS under its interpretation of the principle of Kavod HaBriyot, the Talmudic rule of legal reasoning that rabbinic (but not Biblical) restrictions can be overridden based on "respect for others" or "human dignity". Holding that the concept of kavod habriyot interpreted as human dignity reflects Conservative Judaism's evolving understanding of human nature, it found rabbinic restrictions on homosexual conduct inconsistent with human dignity contemporarily understood and accordingly declared such restrictions lifted. Finding that it lacked authority under the kavod habriyot principle to lift biblical prohibitions, it analyzed the Biblical passages involved and found that male-male anal sex was the sole De'oraitha (Biblical) restrictions. It held that such conduct remained prohibited in Conservative Judaism as a Biblical prohibition. The responsum permitted Conservative rabbis to allow same-sex union ceremonies and gave the option for Conservative rabbinical schools to admit and ordain openly gay, bisexual, and lesbian rabbis. It held that same-sex couples should be presumed not to engage in prohibited conduct in the same way that Conservative Judaism presumes that married heterosexual couples observe sexual prohibitions such as Niddah.

The responsum begins with a quote from Rabbi Abraham Yitzhak HaKohen Kook,

The light of the Messiah, when it blazes in the heart, teaches one to dignify all people: “It shall be on that day that the root of Jesse will stand as a sign to the nations, and peoples will seek him, and his consolation shall be dignity." (Isaiah 11:10)

After a discussion of contemporary theories of sexuality and a warning against promiscuity, the responsum interprets Leviticus 18:22 and 20:13 as pertaining to male-male anal sex only:

Ancient authors employed euphemism when describing sex, making it difficult to prove exactly what activities they understood to be included within these verses. Is it possible that the biblical prohibition called mishk’vei ishah and later, by the Rabbis, mishkav zakhur, includes actions other than anal intercourse? These verses have been variously translated, but almost all readers conclude that they prohibit anal sex between men, with the first verse addressing only the insertive partner, and the second verse including the receptive partner.

We have demonstrated that only one form of homosexual intimacy, anal intercourse between men, is prohibited at this level as an ervah. We must conclude that any Jew who seeks to fulfill the Torah's commandments must avoid this forbidden act.

The responsum also insisted that Jewish law could not be interpreted any more permissively:

In contrast, our colleagues Rabbis David Fine, Robert Fine and Myron Geller have argued that the verses in Leviticus should be understood to prohibit only those sexual relationships that offer no possibility of marriage. In an age when gay marriage is permitted by some jurisdictions, they argue, the Torah's ban is no longer universal. Although they present their reading as “the p’shat,” there is nothing simple or contextual about this interpretation. Nowhere does the passage mention marriage. The list of forbidden sexual relations includes menstrual sex, which can occur within a marital context. It is hard to accept that the Torah forbids bestiality only because it offers no opportunity for marriage. This reading, too, is sui generis — unsupported by either ancient or modern commentaries.

The responsum described rabbinic prohibitions on sexual relations as mere fences, many of which, it said, the Conservative movement had already lifted. It compared Rabbinic prohibitions on homosexual conduct to strictures on a husband approaching or touching his wife during the Niddah (post-menstrual) period:

However, our community does not enforce, and indeed does not accept, these severe prohibitions. We do not hold, as a matter of fact, that the laws of ”approach” are biblically mandated, but rather that they are in the category of rabbinic fences and borders that are all ultimately intended to protect against transgression of the fundamental biblical rules about sexual conduct. Just as the Sages of old exempted themselves from some of the severity of the laws against contact between the sexes between relatives,45 so have we concluded that average people can be trusted to maintain appropriate relations despite social kissing and hugging and moments alone together, even behind locked doors.

This teshuvah distinguishes between a Torah mitzvah and later rabbinical fence laws. It argues (page 8) that:

"We conclude that there is only one prohibited sexual relation of arayot among homosexual behaviors, which is anal sex between men, and that other restrictions have no basis in biblical legislation. ...While some readers might conclude from the texts reviewed above that Jewish law imposes a universal and undifferentiated ban on all homosexual intimacy, we must emphasize the nuances found in this literature. ...The Torah's most severe sexual prohibitions are identified as ervah (plural: arayot). In antiquity, these were punishable by death as well as by the severe divine penalty known as karet. Of these sexual prohibitions alone did the rabbis teach, yeihareig v’al ya’avor, that one should die rather than transgress. We have demonstrated that only one form of homosexual intimacy, anal intercourse between men, is prohibited at this level as an ervah..."

The responsum questioned whether requiring celibacy for same-sex couples was feasible, quoting Deuteronomy 30:11–14:

For this mitzvah which I command you today is not too grand for you, nor is it far away. It is not in heaven, that it be said, ‘who will ascend to heaven to get it for us, and teach us how to do it?’ It is not across the sea,...

The responsum invoked and extensively commented on the concept of Kevod HaBriyot, "human dignity," noting that the concept is traditionally limited to Rabbinic enactments:

So great is human dignity that it supersedes a negative commandment of the Torah. Yet no sooner is this potentially radical principle enunciated than it is limited specifically to the commandment that establishes rabbinic authority, לא תסור “do not stray from the law they [i.e., the rabbis] teach you right or left.” This concern for human dignity is cited in both Talmuds to override certain injunctions, but it is not considered capable of overturning an explicit biblical rule.

After an extensive discussion of this principle, the responsum applies it to declare all rabbinic prohibitions on homosexual conduct overridden, leaving only what it finds to be the biblical one:

It is not possible to set aside the explicit biblical prohibition on anal sex that is stated twice in Leviticus and frequently reaffirmed by the Rabbis. As we have shown, the kvod habriot principle supersedes rabbinic, not biblical law. Of course, there is a theoretical way to overturn biblical law via the legislative mechanism of takkanah (decree). We do not find this mechanism to be appropriate in our case, because takkanah requires the consent of the majority of the population, and this subject remains quite controversial in the observant Jewish community.

However, the rabbinic restrictions upon gay men and lesbian women that result in a total ban on all sexual expression throughout life are in direct conflict with the ability of these Jews to live in dignity as members of the people of Israel. For this reason, the halakhic principle of gadol k’vod habriot must be invoked by the CJLS to relieve their intolerable humiliation. We must make open and rigorous efforts to include gay and lesbian Jews in our communities, to provide a proper welcome and a legal framework for the normalization of their status in our congregations.

In conclusion, the responsum declined to rule on the status of same-sex relationships but declared that "the celebration of such a union is appropriate."

We are not prepared at this juncture to rule upon the halakhic status of gay and lesbian relationships. To do so would require establishing an entirely new institution in Jewish law that treats not only the ceremonies and legal instruments appropriate for creating homosexual unions but also the norms for the dissolution of such unions. This responsum does not provide kiddushin for same-sex couples. Nonetheless, we consider stable, committed, Jewish relationships to be as necessary and beneficial for homosexuals and their families as they are for heterosexuals. Promiscuity is not acceptable for either homosexual or heterosexual relationships. Such relationships should be conducted in consonance with the values set out in the RA pastoral letter on intimate relationships, “This Is My Beloved, This Is My Friend”: A Rabbinic Letter on Human Intimacy. The celebration of such a union is appropriate.

=== The Roth responsum ===
The CJLS also adopted two restrictive responsa, one as a majority and one as a minority opinion. The majority responsum, by Rabbi Joel Roth, was also adopted by 13 votes. It maintained traditional prohibitions on homosexual conduct and forbade Conservative rabbis from blessing same-sex unions and rabbinical schools from ordaining gay, bisexual, and lesbian clergy. On December 10, Rabbi Roth published an editorial in the Jewish Theological Seminary's newsletter JTS News providing some of the reasoning behind his responsum and explaining why he resigned following the CJLS's vote."

According to Rabbi Roth, the central problem with the permissive responsum is that it adopted a claim that the Biblical prohibition on homosexual conduct is limited to anal sex only based on insufficient support in precedent, the view of only "one sage". Rabbi Roth argued that it is impermissible to adopt such a minority view:

What divided us was the question of our right to adopt a legal stance attributed to one sage that the prohibitions against sexual behavior other than male intercourse are rabbinic in status, d’rabbanan, and not biblical, which attribution is itself open to serious question and is denied by most decisors.

Rabbi Roth also said, "Even if the prohibition against sexual behavior other than male intercourse is rabbinic in authority and not biblical, what justifies our abrogating that prohibition?" He argued that the Talmudic concept of Kavod HaBriyot, which the permissive responsum used as justification for doing so, is not the same thing as the idea of "human dignity" in contemporary liberalism:

In almost all of the cases in which the category is invoked, the claim is that X may violate the law out of deference to the honor of Y. In the case under discussion, X is to be entitled to violate the law out of deference to his own honor, for which claim there is no real precedent.

What's more, such a claim is theologically weak, since no law-abiding Jew would ever entertain the possibility that his honor would supersede that of God. And in the few cases of application of the category which can possibly be understood to imply that X may violate the law out of deference to his own honor, X is always literally in a social context and in the presence of others.

Rabbi Roth stated that, in his perception, the supporters of the permissive responsum were blinded by their predisposition to rule favorably and were unable to view the issue with a dispassionate legal mind.

How halachically defensible does an argument have to be before it can be considered within the halachic ballpark? We all understand and agree that decisors of Jewish law often approach the subject before them with a predisposition to give a specific answer. There's nothing wrong with that, in my opinion. What, then, distinguishes a good decisor from a poor one? The good decisor is able to judge his decision with enough dispassion to see whether his predisposition has blinded him to the indefensibility of his answer, and the poor one is not. It is my opinion that my colleagues have here been blinded to the indefensibility of their conclusion. ."

Rabbi Roth argued that the halakhic legitimacy of the Conservative movement was at stake:

What is at stake here, for me, and I believe for the Committee on Jewish Law and Standards as a body, is whether the Law Committee can continue to be seen as a halakhic decision-making body. For all of the breadth I believe that there is for pluralism within halakhah, some decisions are outside those boundaries. If we make such a decision, we are no longer legitimate halakhists, we undermine our authority as the interpreters of God's will, and we render the Law Committee halakhically irrelevant.

Rabbi Roth ended by articulating what he regarded as the fundamental difference between the traditionalist and the liberal wings of the Conservative movement. From the traditionalist point of view, acceptance of the hypothesis that the Torah was transmitted through multiple manuscripts and redactors in no way changes its status as a Divine, "legally infallible" document, a "given" reality to which any theological theory must conform:

That, then, brings us to the following issue: Assuming that the type of biblical scholarship we have all been taught is correct, does that mean that the Torah is, in fact, not Divine and legally infallible? I believe that it does not mean that. The argument here is over the following issue: Is theology the dog which wags the tail called halakhah, or is halakhah the dog which wags the tail called theology? It cannot be both ways.
There can be no real doubt that normatively speaking the halakhic tradition is the given, and theology is required to fall into place behind it. Theology can, indeed, should, provide the narrative which makes the halakhic tradition intellectually persuasive and emotionally acceptable and satisfying, and that narrative can change as needed, and it need not be the same narrative for everyone. Narratives, after all, are aggadic, and thus, neither normative nor binding. That claim, incidentally, in no way diminishes their importance. Whatever narrative works is fine, so long as the narrative does not reverse which is the dog and which is the tail. In this enterprise we are again in a long chain: Sa’adia Ga’on did it, Yehuda ha-Levi did it, Maimonides did it, Samson Rafael Hirsch did it, David Zevi Hoffman did it, and Joseph Hertz did it. Our movement's thinkers and theologians are as competent to provide a modern and persuasive theology of halakhah as were the thinkers of the past. But, we, like they, cannot undo the foundational premise of the entire halakhic system – that the Torah is Divine and legally infallible.

=== The Levy responsum ===
Rabbi Leonard Levy's responsum, adopted as a minority opinion by six votes, delineated ways in which to ensure that gays and lesbians would be accorded human dignity and a respected place in Conservative communities and institutions while maintaining the authority of the traditional prohibitions against same-sex sexual activity.

=== The Tucker dissent ===
The CJLS rejected a proposed responsum by Rabbi Gordon Tucker, which would have lifted all restrictions on homosexual conduct. Although it gained seven votes, the minimum to accept a responsum, it was classified as a takkanah (legislative decree) rather than a judicial interpretation. By CJLS procedural rules a takkanah requires 13 votes to pass. Accordingly, it was published as a dissenting opinion with a note that "concurring and dissenting opinions are not official positions of the Committee on Jewish Law and Standards". The fundamental premise of the dissenting opinion was that the Torah is not infallible, legally or otherwise, but is subject to reconsideration based on subsequent knowledge:

When someone says, “What can we do? The Torah is clear on the subject!”, what is being said amounts to a claim of infallibility and irrefutability for the text of the Torah. And that claim ultimately rests on the assumption that the words of Leviticus (and, of course, those of the other four books of the Pentateuch) express directly and completely the will of God. (Indeed, treating a text as infallible on any basis other than on such an assumption would surely count as a form of idolatry.) But that assumption (that the Torah is the direct and complete expression of God's will) is one that, for all its currency in parts of the Jewish world, is not accepted in our Conservative Jewish world.

No, the time has come for a movement that has finally published a Humash commentary that reflects the theology our masters have taught us to “come out of the closet”. It is past time for us to be, in the prophet Elijah's words, “hopping between two opinions”. If the axiom behind this theological argument is to be accepted, then let us forthrightly admit that we have been misled by the teachers at whose feet we have sat. But if we confess that we do not accept the axiom of biblical infallibility, then let us honor our teachers by abandoning this theological argument, and by no longer permitting ourselves to say, when the matter of gays and lesbians comes up, “What can we do? The Torah is clear on the subject!” Could it perhaps be that critical study itself was given to us precisely so that we would not let the text of the Torah stand as an impediment to the acceptance, fulfilment, and normalization of God's creatures?

=== The Geller, Fine, and Fine dissent ===
Rabbis Myron Geller, Robert Fine, and David Fine wrote a dissent arguing for the complete abolition of strictures against homosexual conduct and explicit recognition of same-sex religious commitment ceremonies on grounds that strictures were no longer socially relevant and religious support was now socially required. The opinion characterized Halakha as

a historically based religious/legal system that reflects the values, ethics and circumstances of the Jewish people at any particular period and whose evolving judgments, including those recorded in Scripture, are expressions of Jewish ideals in a given place and time.

The responsum argued that so regarded, Halakah can and should be updated to reflect changed values and social circumstances as they arise.

== Aftermath of the 2006 decisions ==
The consequences of the decision have been mixed, both in the U.S. and elsewhere.

On the one hand, four members of the Committee, Rabbis Joel Roth, Leonard Levy, Mayer Rabinowitz, and Joseph Prouser, resigned from the CJLS following adoption of the change. On the other hand, the Ziegler School of Rabbinic Studies of the University of Judaism (now the American Jewish University) in Los Angeles had previously stated that it would immediately begin admitting gay, bisexual, and lesbian students as soon as the law committee passed a policy that sanctions such ordination. The Masorti movements in Argentina and the United Kingdom and the Neologs in Hungary at first indicated that they will not admit or ordain homosexual rabbinical students.

The Masorti Movement's Israeli Seminary also rejected a change in its view of the status of homosexual conduct, stating that "Jewish law has traditionally prohibited homosexuality." However, the Seminary reversed its position in April 2012, when it approved the ordination of gay, bisexual, and lesbian rabbis in Israel.

In June 2012, the American branch of Conservative Judaism formally approved same-sex marriage ceremonies in a 13-0 vote. The British Masorti Movement voted to allow its rabbis to conduct same-sex marriages in 2014. However, each of the 12 Masorti communities will be free to decide, whether they want to conduct same-sex marriage or remain only with heterosexual marriage.

== Rights for LGBTQ Conservative Jews ==
The Torah mentions explicitly two times that an act is prohibited, in Leviticus 18:22 and Leviticus 20:13. While the Biblical Hebrew phrase for the act is obscure and likely an ancient euphemism, a long history of traditional Jewish interpretation agrees that it specifically means "anal sex between men." The prohibition has usually been extended to sexual relations between men in general, and often to sexual acts between women as well, in the history of the Conservative movement and Halacha overall. While they are never discussed directly in Torah, the law has been extended to sexual acts between women based on principles of religious interpretation, or an assumption by some rabbis that the unspecified "sins of the Egyptians" referred to in Lev. 18:3 included sex between women. The 2006 decision ruled on male anal sex in particular, leaving room for interpretation for Jewish lesbian couples.

Progress has been made for same-sex couples in Conservative Judaism; they are now allowed to marry and receive guidance and support. In 2012, the U.S. Conservative movement endorsed gay marriage and provided guidelines for same-sex divorce. While conservative Jewish rabbis may now bless same-sex marriages, men are expected not to have anal sex with each other because of the verses in Leviticus, and the movement recommends that people who do experience heterosexual attraction marry heterosexually (halachic law gives women the right to sexual satisfaction from a husband and men the obligation to have children, if they can). The Torah verses prohibiting anal sex between men complicate the Conservative movement's position on homosexuality because many people confuse the two. In halachic law, the authority of a statement in Torah is higher than the authority of an agreement among rabbis. So it is much simpler for rabbis to change rules made in statements by past rabbis (prohibitions on ordaining gay rabbis or performing gay unions) than it is to issue new decisions about how to interpret statements made in Torah (Lev. 18:22 and 20:13). The Reform movement does not have this problem because Reform rabbis and synagogues do not abide by halachic law. Conservative Judaism also differs from the Reform movement on marriage; because a Jewish religious marriage includes kiddushin, an ancient legal action a man does to acquire a wife, the U.S. Conservative movement offers a new form of contract for same-sex couples, the Covenant of Loving Partners. The Reform movement recognizes same-sex marriages as including kiddushin, and typically alters the ritual to be mutual for both heterosexual and homosexual couples.

Regarding rights, in 2013, the USCJ found these results in Conservative synagogues:

- 80% of Conservative synagogues had membership policies allowing same-sex couples to have a family/household membership
- 60% reported they have members who openly identify as gay, lesbian, bisexual, transgender, or queer
- 14% of synagogues had trained staff on LGBTQ inclusion
- 30% had unisex/non-gendered bathrooms

In Israel, many laws are governed by religious authorities, marriage included in this. Because religious law governs marriage, same-sex couples are not recognized as married by religious law. There are some non-profit organizations: Shoval, Bat Kol, and Havruta devoted to educating religious communities on acceptance of the LGBTQ community in Israeli society. Among secular Israeli society, same-sex couples receive most of the same benefits as heterosexual couples. However, among the religious jurisdiction, same-sex couples cannot legally marry in Israel, barring them from being recognized as married by the religious authorities.

== See also ==
- Judaism and sexuality
