= Bal teshaktzu =

Jewish halakhic law

Bal teshaktzu (Hebrew: בל תשקצו, lit. 'avoid disgusting activity') is a Jewish Halakhic law. This law comes from the Torah verse of Leviticus 11:43: "You shall not draw abomination upon yourselves through anything that swarms; you shall not make yourselves impure therewith and thus become impure." The first portion of the verse---"You shall not draw abomination upon yourselves through anything that swarms"---implies that the reader must not consume insects. However, the rabbis interpreted the verse as a general prohibition of consuming and engaging in disgusting things in general.

== Examples ==
Examples of bal teshaktzu violations include:

- withholding defecation or urination (Kitzur Shulchan Arukh 4:1)
- consuming food contaminated with vomit or feces (Shulchan Arukh, Yoreh De'ah 116:6)
- eating food with a placenta (שליא, shilya)
- eating uncooked food
- chewing with one's mouth open
- usage of vulgar or inappropriate language
- dishonoring someone else to attain honor for oneself
- consumption of live fish and grasshoppers

== Exceptions ==
One may eat food with a placenta if the placenta is found within a slaughtered animal. One may consume disgusting medicine to treat an illness "because pikuach nefesh overrides all Torah and Rabbinic prohibitions, except for three cardinal sins" (murder, forbidden sexual relations, and idol worship. One may withhold defecation or urination if the appropriate facilities are not available, as the principle of kevod ha'briyot (respect of all human dignity) overrides the principle of bal teshaktzu.

== Controversy ==
Rabbis disagree on whether or not eating foods that you simply dislike counts as a violation of bal teshaktzu.

== See also ==
- 613 Mitzvot
- Kashrut
- Kosher foods
- Kosher animals
- Kosher wine
- Kosher restaurant
- Tumah and Taharah
- Mikveh
- Ritual washing in Judaism
