= Guide for the Halakhic Minyan =

Guide for the Halakhic Minyan is a work published to provide Jewish worship groups, especially partnership minyans, with halachic sources that support the participation of women in leadership roles in traditional worship services, including the reading from the Torah scroll, haftara, and other special biblical readings, such as the Book of Esther on the Jewish holiday of Purim.

== New lay-led Jewish worship groups ==
Independent minyan is a type of lay-led Jewish worship and study communities that attempt to combine a commitment to traditional worship and egalitarianism in groups that normally avoid identification with one specific Jewish religious movement. The Jewish Orthodox Feminist Alliance (JOFA) refers to partnership minyan similar groups within the Orthodox Jewish community that attempt to involve women in worship services to the maximum extent possible in terms of traditional Jewish legal decisions, while still identifying with the Modern Orthodox community, within the larger movement of Orthodox Judaism.

The word minyan, used in both of terms, comes from the Hebrew word (מנין) for the prayer quorum traditionally required for a full Jewish prayer service.

== Background ==
In 2008, PhD candidates Michal Bar-Asher Siegal and her spouse Elitzur A. Bar-Asher Siegal, who were serving "as halachic consultants" to minyanim in Boston and New Haven, were approached "about formulating a guide for congregations looking to establish egalitarian minyans." They subsequently published the "Guide for the 'Halakhic Minyan.'"

The Bar-Asher Siegals are "Israeli scholars," who, at the time the guide was published, were PhD candidates in the United States. Elitzur A. Bar-Asher Siegal was a PhD candidate in Semitic Philology at Harvard University and lecturer in Semitics at Yale University’s Department of Near Eastern Languages and Civilizations. Michal Bar-Asher Siegal was in the PhD program in the Judaic Studies program, Ancient Judaism at Yale University, a member of the Talmud department at Hebrew University of Jerusalem, and a visiting lecturer in the department of Religion at Smith College.

== Limits ==
Their "Guide to the 'Halakhic Minyan'" lists sources that give some direct support to the participation of women in various parts of the worship service, and also includes suggestions—specifically described as carrying "no halakhic weight" (no legal status)--such as the procedure that might be followed for passing the Torah scroll through the men's and women's seating sections. The guide includes the following disclaimer:

This guide does not attempt to create a unified practice among different congregations. It means only to present to interested readers the conclusions reached by those who have founded and designed the various congregations. The guide outlines the practices that we have deemed permissible; each congregation should come to its own conclusions according to its reasoning and circumstances.

The guide is meant to help minyanim seeking halakhic justification for expansion of women in leadership roles in different areas of the service and in different ways, whether or not complete egalitarianism, equal roles, is part of the minyan's self-described vision or goals: "While many...minyanim aim to extend participation to women as far as Halacha permits, they are by no means egalitarian - hence the phrase 'halachic minyan' in the title of the guide, and not 'egalitarian minyan.'"

One example of "partnership" which would not be considered "egal" is the suggestion that in minyanim where only men are allowed to "sound" the shofar (ram's horn), women could call out the commands that describe the pattern of sounds called for at that point in the service.

The authors of the guide go on to say that, "We are engaged in a continuous process of study and clarification. Therefore, this guide should not be taken as comprehensive, and no inference should be made from silence.”

== Content ==
The Guide's introduction includes the following description of three general categories of prayers as they relate to the leadership role of women:

From the perspective of the halakhic feasibility of women’s leadership, the prayer service may be divided into three categories:

1. Parts for which there is no reason to forbid women’s leadership. Typically, these parts may be left out of the service or led by a child.
2. Parts of the service for which there is reason to think that women’s leadership would be problematic (devarim shebikdusha, sections that involve positive time-bound commandments or in which the leader fulfills the congregation’s obligation, etc.), but for which women’s leadership is explicitly licensed among some (if in some instances only a minority of) halachic decisors.
3. Parts where women are barred from fulfilling the congregation’s obligation, though even here, halakhic solutions can be advanced.

The Guide then attempts to apply these classifications to sections of the service, in the following areas:

- Minyan
- Weekday services
- Rosh Chodesh (New Moon)
- Shabbat
- The Three Pilgrimage Festivals: Passover, Shavuot, and Sukkot
- Elul (the final month of the Jewish year) and the High Holy Days
- Days of Thanksgiving: Hanukkah, Purim, Israeli Independence Day, and Jerusalem Day
- Tisha B'Av and other ta'anit (fast days).

== Response ==
Many readers welcomed the guide, and the Bar-Asher Siegals report that they "have received a constant flow of correspondence" since the Guide's publication. A number of minyanim, like Minyan Urim at Yale, linked the Guide to their websites.

However, there were negative reactions to its publication, as well. For example, in a Jerusalem Post op-ed, Alan Haber wrote that the guide is "not a work of halacha" because:

- The guide "utilizes sources selectively and partially, without regard to majority opinion or precedent."
- It sometimes issues rulings "in express contradiction to the conclusion drawn by the authorities they cite as proof."
- It assesses sources "tendentiously", seeking to find sources to justify a pre-determined agenda rather than to neutrally discern the intent of the earlier authorities.
- Its authors are not rabbis, and are seeking to determine by lay decision-making matters on which Rabbinic Judaism defers to rabbis."

Haber wrote that the final point reveals a "fundamental deficiency" of the Guide, because:

More than anything else, Halacha requires submission to the authority of poskim - halachic decisors. One is free to choose a halachic authority who shares one's world view, and there is also room for debate about the exact scope and extent of the posek's authority. But Halacha is a system of law based on commandments; it is not source material for independent decision-making.".

However, this is exactly the position the authors of the Guide seek to refute. Elitzur Bar-Asher Siegal states, “If you have the knowledge, you just don’t need a rabbi.... In fact, what you actually see is we will always be much closer to the text because if you have a mediator they manipulate the text.”

“We say," he continues, "if you look very carefully at the sources ... if you look at them carefully, there’s a lot of opportunity for women to be incorporated or lead those prayer services....The problem is, if you’re dealing with the establishment, that’s much harder to do.”

In terms of the charge sometimes leveled against them that the couple approaches halakhah "with an agenda," both Elitzur and Michal admit that this claim is true, and that they both are in favor of "gender equality." However, in their opinion there is nothing wrong with such a goal, so long as they respect the law:

"The important thing is that we are obligated by halachah and recognise that we can't actively change any existing rules. That does not mean there is anything wrong with searching to find out if there are things that sources allow women to do which they just don't tend to do."
