= Jean Gornish =

American singer

Jean Gornish (1916–1981) was an American chazante, a female performer of Jewish cantorial and liturgical music. She is often called the first female chazan, and was known as "Sheindele di Chazante".

== Life ==
Gornish was born in 1916 in Philadelphia. As a child, she was run over by a garbage truck, but survived unhurt. Despite offers of work as a nightclub singer after her high school graduation, by 1936 she had committed herself exclusively to cantorial music. She took the stage name "Sheindele di Chazante".

Gorlish's manager, Ben Gottlieb, arranged for her to perform regularly on the radio on Sundays after the news broadcast. She was unable to perform in orthodox synagogues, which prohibited female performers.

By the early 1940s, Sheindele's had signed an exclusive contract with the Planters Peanut Company, which allowed her to organize a touring schedule and radio programs in Philadelphia, New York, and Chicago, performing in theaters such as the 3,000-seat Orchestra Hall in Chicago and the Milwaukee Auditorium.

Sheindele performed in traditional cantorial garb—a satin robe and a skullcap, either black or High Holiday white.
