= Kavod HaBriyot =

Concept of Halakha (Jewish law) originating in the Talmud

Kevod HaBeriyot (Hebrew: כבוד הבריות; literally in Hebrew: "honor [of/due to] the [God's] creations (human beings)" also variously translated as "individual dignity", "individual honor", or "human dignity" (in a specifically Talmudic sense which may or may not be the same as the secular concept of human dignity) is a concept of Halakha (Jewish law) originating in the Talmud which permits exceptions to Rabbinic decrees under certain circumstances. This concept has been used in a number of contemporary Jewish religious-law decisions in Orthodox and Conservative Judaism.

The nature and scope of the concept is a matter of contemporary dispute.

Kevod HaBeriyot is mentioned in the Babylonian Talmud in Berakhot 19b; Shabbat 81b, 94b; Eruvin 41b; and Megillah 3b. The term Kevodo (his dignity) is used in Beitzah 32b.

== Talmudic context ==
The Tannaim (rabbis of the Mishnah) and the Amoraim (rabbis of the Talmud) applied the concept of Kevod HaBriyot in their interpretations of and rulings on halakhah (Jewish law). The Mishnah explains the importance of the concept as follows:

"Ben Zoma says: איזהו מכובד? המכבד את הבריות Who is honored (mechubad)? He who honors (mechabed) others (habriyot), as it is said: 'For those who honor Me (God) I will honor, and those who scorn Me shall be degraded' (Samuel I 2:30)" Mishnah (Avot 4:1)

The Rabbis of the Talmud, when they enacted rabbinic decrees, sometimes limited the scope of those decrees to avoid situations when complying with them might lead to a situation they considered undignified and referred to the concept of kevod habriyot as the basis for doing so. For example, carrying across a private property line is prohibited by a rabbinic prohibition (See eruv), but the Talmud records that the Rabbis created an exception for carrying up to three small stones if needed for wiping oneself in a latrine on the basis of kevod habriyot (Shabbat 81b, 94b). Similarly, the rabbis enacted a prohibition on a Kohen from approaching a coffin or graveyard to ensure that the Biblical prohibition on contact with the dead would not be inadvertently violated, but permitted a Kohen to violate this rabbinic prohibition in order to greet a king, again appealing to the principle of kevod habriyot as the basis of this exception (Berachot 19b). Tractate Beitzah records that the rabbis created an exception of the rabbinic prohibition on creating even temporary structures on Shabbat or major Jewish holidays (to safeguard the Biblical prohibition against building permanent structures) to permit a person alone in a field to align stones to create a temporary latrine, because of kevodo ("his dignity) (Beitzah 36b).

Although the Rabbis of the Talmud created limited exceptions to their own enactments to prevent indignities, they held that they do not have authority to create exceptions to Divine law recorded in the written Tanakh or received as Oral law in the form of Halakha LeMoshe MiSinai. Berachot 19b records a discussion in which a tradition that rabbis have such authority was explicitly considered but rejected.

== In the Shulkhan Arukh ==
The Shulkhan Arukh, a seminal code of Jewish law, used a dramatic example to illustrate its holding that kevod habriyot does not override Biblical prohibitions. It held that an observant Jew who becomes aware of Biblically prohibited clothing should remove it immediately even if it leaves a colleague naked in a public place, illustrating that biblical prohibitions trump even strong considerations of modesty and even great public embarrassment.

The Halakha in the Shulkhan Arukh goes according to Rav:

Shulkhan Arukh, Yoreh De'ah 303:1 "[That it is] Permissible to remove kilayim from [his] friend even in [the] marketplace:

[Mechaber]: One who sees kilayim of (forbidden by) the Torah on his friend even if they were walking in the marketplace [he] jumps upon him and tears it from upon him immediately even if he was his rabbi
[Ramo]: And there are those who say that if had worn them in error then he does not need to tell him about it in the markerplace because of Kevod HaBriyot he [should] remain silent and not remove it due to [the] error [of the wearer] (Tur in the name of the Rosh)
[Mechaber]: And if it was [forbidden] by the words [of the rabbis] (divreihem) he does not tear it from him and he does not remove it in the marketplace until he arrives at home
[Ramo]: And also (likewise) in the Beth midrash there is no need to hurry to leave (Tur)
[Mechaber]: But if it was from (forbidden by) the Torah he removes immediately.

== Contemporary descriptions ==
Mishpat Ivri expert Menachem Elon, in his Encyclopaedia Judaica article on Takkanot emphasized the importance of Kevod HaBriyot:

The scholars stressed the need to guard, in the exercise of such wide legislative authority, against doing undue injury to man's image and dignity: "All these matters apply to the extent that the dayyan shall find them proper in the particular case and necessitated by the prevailing circumstances; in all matters he shall act for the sake of Heaven and he shall not lightly regard the dignity of man... "(Yad, Sanhedrin 24:10; see also Resp. Rashba, vol. 5, no. 238)

In the Encyclopaedia Judaica article on Honor Rabbi Louis Isaac Rabinowitz wrote that "So great was 'the honor of God's creatures' regarded that 'God has regard to the dignity of His creatures' (Sif. Deut. 192) and honor annuls even a negative commandment of the Bible (Ber. 19b), especially the honor of the community (TJ, Ber. 3:1, 6a)."

Most classical poskim, however, maintained in accordance with the opinion in the Talmud that Kevod HaBriyot can only justify overriding rabbinic restrictions. The reference to "annulling a negative commandment of the Bible" refers only to the commandment lo tasur, in other words the command to observe rabbinic restrictions, so the Talmud is in fact saying the same thing but in a deliberately paradoxical way.

== Contemporary responsa in Orthodox Judaism ==
=== Euthanasia ===
Rabbi Immanuel Jakobovits held that because the principle of kevod habriyot reflects a perspective on values requiring a respect for life, Jewish law prohibits euthanasia.

=== Hearing aids on Shabbat ===
Rabbi Eliezer Waldenberg held that wearing a hearing aid on Shabbat represents a modern analogy to classically permitted activities such as carrying stones and hence the principle of kevod habriyot overrides the rabbinic prohibitions involved and renders it permitted.

=== Women and Torah reading ===
Modern Orthodox rabbi Daniel Sperber held that the principle of kevod habriyot permits women to be called to a Torah reading in a synagogue service (See support for partnership minyanim). R. Sperber's responsum addressed the traditional view that halachah in principle permits a woman to be called but the "honour of the congregation" forbids it. In R. Rabbi Sperber's view, kevod habriyot, the "honour of the individual", can override the honor of the congregation in much the same way that it had been interpreted to override other rabbinic prohibitions. R. Sperber's view has been a controversial one within Orthodox Judaism and has not gained widespread acceptance.

Rabbi Aryeh A. Frimer, author of a number of scholarly works on the status of women in Orthodox halakha including Women and Minyan, wrote a critique of Rabbi Sperber's arguments which he entitled "Lo Zu haDerekh: A Review of Rabbi Prof. Daniel Sperber's Darka shel Halakha. In Rabbi Frimer's view, the concept of kevod habriyot can override rabbinic prohibitions under relatively narrow circumstances caused by external factors such as excrement or nakedness, but cannot override a rabbinic prohibition in its entirety. He argued that a rabbinic decree cannot itself be regarded shameful or embarrassing, and that to permit a rabbinic decree to be characterized as an embarrassment would give anyone carte blanche to abrogate any Rabbinic prohibition simply by saying "This offends me." He said "in those cases where acting according to halakha...creates the embarrassment, then kevod ha-beriyyot cannot set aside the Rabbinic prohibition. One should be proud to be fulfilling the halakha.". A more complete and extensively documented presentation of Rabbi Frimer's position has appeared.

== Contemporary response in Conservative Judaism ==
In December 2006, Conservative Judaism's Committee on Jewish Law and Standards discussed the Conservative understanding of the concept of kevod habriyot as applied to the CJLS's decisionmaking in a series of decisions on the Conservative understanding of Jewish law on the subject of homosexuality. A majority of the Committee voted to adopt two very different responsa under its philosophy of pluralism. The two responsa based their different conclusions in part on different understandings of the concept of kevod habriyot

Rabbis Dorff, Nevins, and Reisner wrote a responsum which supported liberalizing Conservative Judaism's view of homosexual behavior. They held that rabbinic prohibitions against homosexual behavior are inconsistent with human dignity as society now understands it. They argued that the Conservative understanding of the principle of Kevod habriyot includes general society's evolving understanding of human dignity and that the rabbinic prohibitions involved were inconsistent with human dignity thus understood. Citing R. Daniel Sperber's view that rabbinic prohibitions can be negated by the kevod habriyot principle, the responsum declared all rabbinic prohibitions restricting homosexual activity lifted. Finding that the principle of kevod habriyot could only override rabbinic and not Biblically mandated restrictions, the responsum left in place what it found to be the only Biblically mandated restriction involved, a prohibition on male-male anal sex.

Rabbi Joel Roth wrote a responsum which supported maintaining traditional restrictions on homosexual behavior, which was also adopted by a majority of the Committee on Jewish Law and Standards. The responsum analyzed the principle of kevod habriyot and held that the rule only permits overriding rabbinic injunctions out of honor or respect for someone else, but not out of one's own honor. Rabbi Roth argued that the idea that a person's own honor (as distinct from giving honor to someone else) could justify overriding a rabbinic injunction was not only inconsistent with a fair reading of the history of the concept, but theologically unjustifiable. The responsum argued that the principle behind kevod habriyot is the idea that a person can honor God by honoring others, and that this principle does not apply in cases where one's own honor, as distinct from others' honor, is at stake. It held that overriding a rabbinic prohibition because of one's own sense of personal dignity or self-honor would be tantamount to considering one's own honor as more important than God's in matters between oneself and God. The responsum also found the Biblically mandated restrictions involved to be more extensive in scope.

== See also ==
- Chillul Hashem
- Kiddush Hashem
- Lashon hara
- Lifnei iver
- Mussar movement
- Self-sacrifice under Jewish law
