= Paul Doughty Bartlett =

American chemist (1907–1997)

- Born: August 14, 1907; Ann Arbor, Michigan, U.S.
- Died: October 11, 1997 (aged 90)
- Education: Amherst College; Harvard University
- Awards: ACS Award in Pure Chemistry (1938); Willard Gibbs Award (1963); National Medal of Science (1968); William H. Nichols Medal (1976); Welch Award (1981)
- Scientific career
- Workplaces: Rockefeller Institute, University of Minnesota, Harvard University, Texas Christian University
- Doctoral advisor: James Bryant Conant
- Doctoral students: Paul von Ragué Schleyer, James Cullen Martin, Aryeh Frimer

Paul Doughty Bartlett (August 14, 1907 – October 11, 1997) was an American chemist.

== Life and career ==
Bartlett was born in Ann Arbor, Michigan and grew up in Indianapolis. He received his B.A. from Amherst College in 1928. After his graduation from Harvard with James Bryant Conant, Bartlett worked at the Rockefeller Institute and the University of Minnesota. Most of his career was spent at Harvard. Among other achievements, Bartlett was co-author with Lawrence H. Knox of a classic paper on organic reaction mechanisms. After his retirement in 1972, he started his second career at Texas Christian University.

He was elected a Fellow of the American Academy of Arts and Sciences in 1946 and the United States National Academy of Sciences in 1947. He was awarded the Willard Gibbs Award in 1963, National Medal of Science in 1968, and the John Price Wetherill Medal in 1970. In 1969, Paul Doughty Bartlett was elected as member of the German Academy of Sciences Leopoldina. He was elected to the American Philosophical Society in 1978.
