= Hazzanit =

Female hazzan

A ḥazzanit (Hebrew: חזנית, plural חזנות, ḥazzanot) or chazante (Yiddish: חזנטע) is a female hazzan.

== History ==
Traditionally, Jewish law prohibited women from leading prayer services in the synagogue. Even the Reform movement did not train female cantors until the early 1970s. Thus Jewish women historically performed cantorial music only outside the synagogue. Notable chazantes in the mid 20th century include Betty Simonoff, Liviya Taychil, Sabina Kurtzweil, Sophie Kurtzer, Perele Feyg, Jean Gornish and Freydele Oysher. Most of the chazantes followed the tradition of their male counterparts and played up their European pedigrees by adopting nicknames like "Di Odesser chazante" ('The Odessa Chazante') or "Di Ungarishe chazante" ('The Hungarian Chazante').

In recent decades, both the Reform and Conservative movements have allowed women to lead services. Betty Robbins was possibly the first female cantor in 1955, though Barbara Ostfeld-Horowitz is usually given that distinction since her investiture at the Hebrew Union College in 1975. Orthodox Partnership minyanim permit women to lead parts of the prayer services, though such minyanim remain controversial within the Orthodox community, with more traditional and centrist Orthodox rejecting their place in Orthodoxy.

== See also ==
- Role of women in Judaism
- Jewish feminism
- Religious Jewish music
