= Robert Fine =

British sociologist (1945–2018)

Robert Fine (1945 – 9 June 2018) was a British sociologist.

As a political activist, he was associated with the Alliance for Workers’ Liberty and its predecessor organisations for many years.

He was a leading European scholar on the history of social and political thought, cosmopolitan social theory, the social theory of Karl Marx and Hannah Arendt, the Holocaust and contemporary antisemitism, crimes against humanity and human rights. He was a Professor Emeritus at Warwick University. He died on 9 June 2018.

In 1996, he won a landmark case against a student who was stalking him, the first time anyone had won damages for being stalked and the first civil action in which a judge had defined stalking. The case was the topic of his memoir Being Stalked (1997), described by The Daily Telegraph as candid and troubling.

== Publications ==
=== Books ===
- Antisemitism and the Left: On the Return of the Jewish Question (with Philip Spencer, Manchester UP 2017)
- Cosmopolitanism (Routledge Key Ideas 2007)
- Democracy and the Rule of Law: Marx's Critique of the Legal Form (Blackburn Press 2002; Pluto 1984 and 1985)
- Political Investigations: Hegel, Marx, Arendt (Routledge 2001)
- Being Stalked: A Memoir (Chatto and Windus, 1997)
- Beyond Apartheid: Labour and Liberation in South Africa (with Dennis Davis, Pluto 1990)

Edited collections include: Social Theory after the Holocaust (with Charles Turner, Liverpool University Press 2000); People, Nation and State (with Edward Mortimer, IB Tauris 1999); Civil Society: Democratic Perspectives (with Shirin M. Rai, Frank Cass 1997); Policing the Miners' Strike (with Robert Millar, Lawrence and Wishart, Cobden Press 1985); Capitalism and the Rule of Law (with Richard Kinsey, John Lea and Jock Young, Hutchinson).

=== Articles ===
- Prof Robert D Fine(2010) 'Dehumanising the dehumanisers: reversal in human rights discourse?' Journal of Global Ethics 6 (2), 179 - 190 (1744–9626)
- Fine, R.(2010) 'Political argument and the legitimacy of international law' in Legality and legitimacy: normative and sociological approaches, Editors: Thornhill, C. and Ashenden, S. (9783832953546), Baden-Baden: Nomos
- Fine R (2009) 'Cosmopolitanism and Human Rights: Radicalism in a Global Age' Metaphilosophy 40 (1), 8 - 23
- Prof Robert D Fine(2009) 'Fighting with Phantoms: A Contribution to the Debate on Anti-semitism in Europe' Patterns Of Prejudice 43 (5), 459 - 479 (0031-322X)
- Fine, R.(2009) 'An unfinished project: Marx's critique of Hegel's philosophy of right' in Karl Marx and Contemporary Philosophy, 105 - 120, Editors: Chitty, A. and McIvor, M. (9780230222373), Basingstoke; New York: Palgrave MacMillan

Complete list of publications.
