= Aryeh Frimer =

Israeli chemist and rabbi

Aryeh A. Frimer
- אריה אברהם פרימר
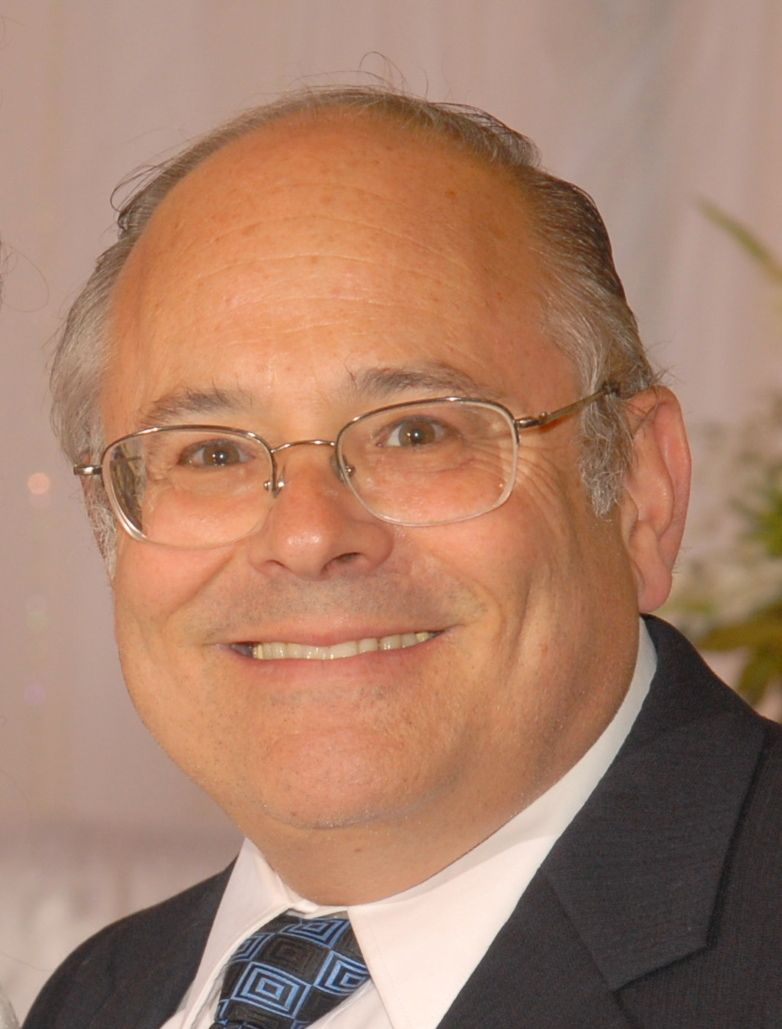
- Born: November 24, 1946 (age 79)
- Education: Brooklyn College; Harvard University
- Known for: active oxygen chemistry and women and Jewish law
- Scientific career
- Fields: Chemistry
- Workplaces: Bar Ilan University
- Doctoral advisor: Paul Doughty Bartlett

Aryeh Abraham Frimer (Hebrew: אריה אברהם פרימר; born November 24, 1946) is an American and Israeli chemist. He is the Ethel and David Resnick Professor of Active Oxygen Chemistry at Bar-Ilan University. He is also a Jewish Rabbi who specialized on women and Jewish law.

== Biography ==
Aryeh Abraham Frimer was born in Minneapolis, Minnesota in 1946 to Norman E. Frimer, a rabbi, and Esther Miriam Frimer. He spent his formative years in Brooklyn. He graduated summa cum laude from Brooklyn College (Phi Beta Kappa; Sigma Xi) with a B.S. degree in Chemistry in 1969. During his undergraduate years he also studied at Yeshivat Kerem B'Yavneh in Israel and then Yeshivat Eretz Israel in Brooklyn with Rabbi Judah Gershuni, one of the last students of Rabbi Abraham Isaac Kook, ultimately receiving Rabbinic Ordination.

He studied organic chemistry at Harvard University under Paul Doughty Bartlett, receiving fellowships from the National Science Foundation and Danforth Foundation. Frimer was also appointed Assistant to the Hillel Director, serving as Rabbi to the Harvard-Radcliffe Orthodox Minyan from 1969-1974. Upon completing his Ph.D. at Harvard in 1974, Aryeh and his family moved to Israel, becoming a postdoctoral research fellow at the Weizmann Institute of Science with Dov Elad. He joined the faculty of Bar Ilan University in 1975, where he is the Ethel and David Resnick Professor of Active Oxygen Chemistry and former Chemistry Department chairman.

From 1982 to 1983, Frimer was a visiting medical scientist at Brookhaven National Laboratory in Upton, New York. From 1990 to 2004, he spent a sabbatical year and consecutive summers as a fellow at the National Research Council and a senior research associate at the Ohio Aerospace Institute at NASA's Glenn Research Center in Cleveland, Ohio. In June 2015, he received Bar Ilan University's Excellence in Teaching Award, and in October 2015, he became a professor emeritus.

Frimer and his wife Esther (née Neiman) have four children and twelve grandchildren. They reside in Rehovot, Israel.

== Scientific Interests and Publications ==
Frimer's research interests include: (1) The organic chemistry of active oxygen species: singlet and triplet molecular oxygen, peroxides, oxy-radicals and superoxide anion radical. (2) The organic chemistry of active oxygen species within organic media, liposomal lipid bilayers, and biomembranes. (3) The preparation of high temperature thermo-oxidatively stable aerospace polymers. (4) The preparation, characterization and neutralization of "green" reduced sensitivity high energy compounds. (5) The formation and chemistry of lithium-oxygen species in Li-O$_2$ batteries. Frimer has published 150 scientific articles, reviews and books in the area of active oxygen chemistry, and given presentations at more than 120 scientific meetings. In 1985, together with Prof. Ionel Rosental, he edited two special issues of the Israeli Journal of Chemistry on "Active Oxygen Chemistry". In the same year, the Chemical Rubber Company (CRC) published his four volume series on "Singlet O$_2$".

== Rabbinic Studies and Writings ==
In addition to his scientific work, Frimer has lectured on Judaism, Zionism and Jewish Identity for officer training courses of the Israel Defense Forces. He has also published some 60 Torah articles and lectured internationally on various aspects of Jewish tradition and Halakha (Jewish law). He is known most prominently for his scholarly writings on the status of women in Jewish ritual and law. He serves on the Rabbinic Board of the Rabbi Jacob Berman Community Center – Tiferet Moshe Synagogue in Rehovot, Israel. The Community Center maintains a website with more than 80 recorded lectures by Frimer given predominantly from 1997-2000 at the Tiferet Moshe Synagogue. The site contains assorted published papers, audio files, source material and unedited lecture notes on women and Jewish law. Frimer has published, inter alia, on women and minyan, women's megilla readings, women in Jewish leadership roles, on questions of liturgy and ritual, and Orthodox Feminism. Together with his brother Dov, Frimer has published several seminal papers on Women's Prayer (Tefilla) Groups and Partnership Minyanim including the issue of women's aliyyot.,

== See also ==
- Kavod HaBriyot
- Partnership Minyan
