= Megillah (Talmud) =

Tractate of the Talmud

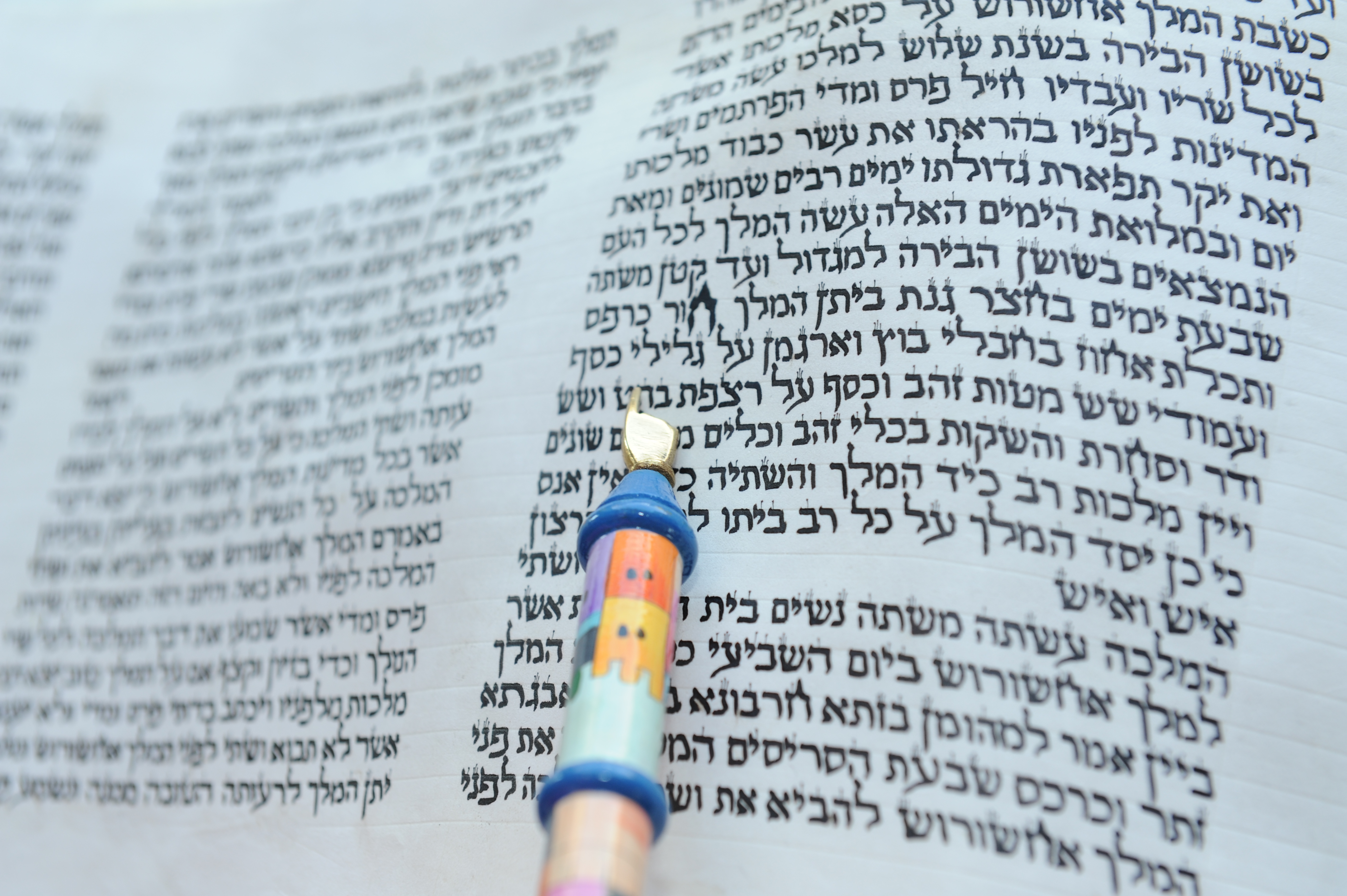
- Beginning of the Book of Esther

Tractate of the Talmud
- English: Scroll
- Seder: Moed
- Number of mishnahs: 33
- Chapters: 4
- Babylonian Talmud pages: 32
- Jerusalem Talmud pages: 24
- Tosefta chapters: 3

Masekhet Megillah (Hebrew: מסכת מגילה, lit. 'Tractate Scroll') is a tractate in Seder Moed of the Babylonian and Jerusalem Talmuds. It deals with laws and stories relating to Purim, a Jewish holiday originating from the Book of Esther. Megillah continues to dictate how Purim is celebrated in Jewish communities worldwide to this day.

== Tannaitic period ==
The Mishnayot of Masekhet Megillah ("Tractate Scroll") were compiled, along with the rest of the Mishnah, by the second or third centuries CE by Rabbi Judah ha-Nasi. Their overall goal is to enumerate the laws for the Jewish holiday of Purim. They consist of four chapters: laws regarding when to read Megillat Esther (the scroll of Esther), when to give gifts to the poor as mandated in the Book of Esther, and various differences between halakhic concepts; laws of how to read the Megillah—including language, the reader, and other factors—and various times during which mitzvot can be performed; laws regarding buying and selling sacred objects as well as which sections of the Torah are read on particular days of the Hebrew calendar; and further laws regarding reading the Megillah, though the majority deals with laws of public Torah reading and tefillot. Like other tractates of the Mishnah, the Mishnayot of Megillah for the most part do not elaborate or give reasons.

The Tosefta of Megillah has three chapters; it includes several halakhot from the Tannaitic period that are included in the Mishnah, but it also adds more regarding many of the same topics, including the proper way to read the Megillah as well as the treatment of sacred objects. Several of the halakhot from the Tosefta that were not included in the Mishnah are brought up as additional Tannaitic sources in the Talmud.

== Talmud ==
=== Babylonian ===
The first page (2a) of the Vilna daf edition Babylonian Megillah

Masechet Megillah of the Babylonian Talmud (Gemara) is a commentary of the Amoraim that analyzes and discusses the Mishnayot of the same tractate; however, it does not do so in order: the first chapter of each mirror each other, as do the second chapters, but the Gemara's third chapter reflects the fourth of the Mishnah, and the fourth comments on the third.

The second chapter, "Hakoreh L'mafre'ah" (one who reads out of order), opens with a discussion on the prohibition of reading the Megillah out of order; this delves into reasons why other tefillot—Hallel, the Shema, and the Amidah—also cannot be said out of order. In the same standard Talmudic fashion, the Gemara goes through each law of the Mishnah, quoting Tannaim and Amoraim's statements on the topics. For the most part, other than the out-of-order laws, the chapter does not go into tangents unrelated to the Mishnah at hand.

This is also true in chapter three, "Hakoreh Omed" (one who reads standing), though the Amoraim do dive into a law regarding Tachanun that appears in a story related to the laws of Torah reading. The majority of the fourth chapter, "Bnei Ha'ir" (people of the city), is unrelated to the Book of Esther and the holiday of Purim, instead giving a several-page-long discussion on sacred items, such as synagogues, Torah scrolls, Torah arks, Torah wrappings, and sefarim (books). The remainder analyzes the Mishnayot that specify which sections of the Torah to read on particular days.

== Halakhic codification ==
The laws regarding reading the Megillah were codified in various halakhic codes, notably including Maimonides's Mishneh Torah and the Shulchan Aruch, Rabbi Joseph Karo's (Beit Yosef) widely accepted code of halakha; they make up the majority of the 690th topic on the latter's Orach Chayim (daily life) section. While Rabbi Karo was a prominent Sephardic posek, Rabbi Moses Isserles (the Rema), who gives the Ashkenazi perspective on the Shulchan Aruch, for the most part does not differ on the codification of Masechet Megillah. Laws regarding Torah reading can be found in other parts of Orach Chayim, as can laws from the fourth chapter about sacred objects.

== Modern impact ==
Masechet Megillah outlines, to at least some degree, the ways in which Jews of all denominations observe the holiday of Purim today. More relevant, however, are two halakhot (laws) regarding women, the first being a blanket statement in the Gemara that the only types of people prohibited from reading the Megillah are deaf people, imbeciles, and minors. When discussing that Mishnah in a separate conversation, Masechet Arakhin adds that listing those groups as disallowed serves to include women. In the Shulchan Aruch's codification, the Beit Yosef mentions that some hold that men cannot fulfil their own obligation from a woman's reading as a woman's obligation, according to Halachot Gedolot, is that of hearing instead of reading. The Rema also mentioned that some hold this in his commentary on that same Beit Yosef law based on the Mordechai.

One contemporary Orthodox conclusion is that for both Ashkenazim and Sephardim, women can indeed not fulfil a man's obligation but can read on behalf of women, based on the majority of rishonim and later halakhic opinions. Major poskim such as former Sephardic Chief Rabbi Ovadia Yosef and Rabbi Aharon Lichtenstein seem to have supported this viewpoint.

The Conservative movement (which has, for some time, been allowing women to participate more in traditional Jewish practice), however, based on a variety of halakhic considerations—including some sources from Masechet Megillah—stated that women and men are equally obligated in the mitzvot, which includes reading the Megillah. Reform Judaism, though less concerned with halakhic support, similarly maintains that women are equal halakhic actors.

The second halakha of modern import is regarding public reading of the Torah, which occurs on Mondays, Thursdays, Shabbatot, and holidays and fast days—quoting the Tosefta, the gemara lays out that while there is no inherent issue with women reading from the Torah, the sages maintained that they should not do so out of respect for the congregation. Similar to the issue of Megillah reading, the Reform movement readily allows this nonetheless, while the Conservative movement does so with a progressive yet halakhic approach, adopted in the late 1970s. While the vast majority of Orthodox congregations across the world only allow men to chant from the Torah, the "Guide for the Halakhic Minyan," based on the Shulchan Arukh, posits that a congregation may waive its kavod tzibbur and allow women to read Torah.

== Sources ==
- Schottenstein Edition of the Babylonian Talmud: Talmud Bavli: The Gemara, Schottenstein Edition - Tractate Megillah, 1991, Artscroll
