= Partnership minyan =

Religious Jewish prayer group

Partnership minyan (pl. partnership minyanim) is a religious Jewish prayer group that seeks to maximize women's participation in services within the confines of Jewish law as understood by Orthodox Judaism. This includes enabling women to lead parts of service, read from the Torah, serve in lay leadership positions, sit in a more gender-balanced format, and in some cases count as part of a minyan ("quorum") of ten men and ten women. Partnership minyanim began in 2002 simultaneously in New York and Jerusalem, and have now spread to over 30 communities in at least five countries around the world.

== Definition ==
The Jewish Orthodox Feminist Alliance (JOFA) defines a partnership minyan as:

[A] prayer group that is both committed to maintaining halakhic standards and practices and also committed to including women in ritual leadership roles to the fullest extent possible within the boundaries of Jewish Law. This means that the minyan is made up of 10 men, men and women are separated by a mechitzah, and the traditional liturgy is used. However, women may fully participate in kriyat ha'Torah (Torah reading), including layning (chanting the text) and receiving aliyot, and may lead parts of the prayer service such as psukei d'zimrah and kabbalat Shabbat, which do not contain d'varim she bikedusha.

Professor Tamar Ross explains:

A small number of communities in the United States and Israel that consider themselves Orthodox (including one Hartman-Halbertal helped to found) have implemented more egalitarian practices in the synagogue. These include the practice of calling women up to the Torah and allowing them to lead those portions of the service that are not halakhically defined as prayer, such as the set of hymns welcoming the advent of the Sabbath. They rely on minority opinions that halakhic problems with men hearing women sing do not apply to synagogue worship.

Some partnership minyanim also wait to begin parts of the service requiring a minyan until 10 women as well as 10 men are present. Such a service is also known as a Shira Hadasha-style minyan, after Kehillat Shira Hadasha in Jerusalem, among the first such prayer groups to be established, in 2001. Various structural innovations have been devised to permit women to lead prayers while maintaining distinct men's and women's sections, such as separate shtenders (reader's lecterns) and a mechitza going down the middle of the room. Men can also be limited in which service parts they can lead.

In response to arguments that the halakhic underpinnings of the approach are stronger if done on a temporary and situational basis, some partnership minyanim, including Shira Hadasha, have deliberately chosen to meet in spaces that are not regularly or permanently used for synagogue worship, and some meet on a situational schedule rather than every Shabbat. In keeping with arguments that women are permitted to read only some but not all the aliyot on shabbat, partnership minyanim generally do not permit women to be called for the two aliyot reserved to a Kohen and Levi if they are present, but only the last five of the seven aliyot on Shabbat, plus the maftir for the reading from the Prophets. In keeping with arguments that the Talmudic sources involved apply only to the seven aliyot on Shabbat, some partnership minyanim meet only on Shabbat or on other occasions, such as Purim, where other special halakhic arguments supporting greater women's participation have been made. (See Women and megilla reading on Purim.)

Some minyanim, especially in Israel, meet regularly on every shabbat and on every holiday.

A small number of partnership minyanim have been established in Israel, the United States, Canada, and Australia. In 2022 Hadar Institute in Jerusalem said that there were at least 50 partnership minyanim in Israel.

== History ==
The first two partnership minyanim were established almost simultaneously without connection to one another in 2002: Shira Hadasha in Jerusalem and Darkhei Noam in New York City. Both described in their founding materials the goal of maximizing women's participation in prayer services within the boundaries of Orthodox understandings of Jewish law. According to scholar William Kaplowitz, within six years there were over twenty other similar synagogues around the world, including: Minyan Tehillah, founded in 2003 in Cambridge, Massachusetts, Shira Hadasha in Melbourne, Australia, Darchei Noam in Modi’in, and others in New York, Chicago, Los Angeles, Toronto, New Haven, Washington, D.C., and several more (including a cluster in the Tri-State area alone). By 2014, an additional dozen or so were created in communities such as Pittsburgh, Pennsylvania, Mazkeret Batya and Beersheba in Israel, two in the United Kingdom, several on college campuses, high-schools, and more.

Some partnership minyanim differ over details—such as whether to wait for ten women or whether women can lead the hallel service—but they all retain certain basic practices. Within a partitioned service, women read from the Torah, make the blessing on the Torah, chant the weekly prophetical portion of the Bible known as haftarah, lead some parts of the service, teach Torah, make speeches, sit on boards, and take part in decision-making. But women do not generally lead parts of the service that are thought to require a traditional quorum, or minyan—such as leading prayers known as kaddish and kedusha, which traditionally require the response of "amen" from ten men.

The spread of partnership minyanim, according to Kaplowitz, does not follow a pattern based on proportionality to size of Orthodox populations. Rather, there are certain regions with clusters and other places with none at all. In his 2008 thesis, he noted: "The Los Angeles area, with around two times as many Jews as the Chicago area, has one partnership minyan to Chicago's three; Southeast Florida, with about twice as many Jews as Chicago, has none. New Haven has a partnership minyan, but Philadelphia, with around twelve times as many Jews, does not. Ann Arbor has a partnership minyan but neither Detroit, Cleveland, nor Baltimore, each with over twelve times as many Jews, does (United Jewish Communities, 2002). In fact, it is worth noting that there are no partnership minyanim in the Sunbelt except for that in Los Angeles; none west of the Atlantic seaboard and east of Michigan; and only one west of Chicago." In his research of this sprawl, Kaplowitz concluded that this is because the partnership minyan is a culture that is transferred one person at a time. The culture does not spread evenly; it spreads when one activist moves and decides to lead the new community towards change. The culture is carried by individuals who have developed an unwavering commitment to the model. In other words, the culture of partnership minyan is spreading because Orthodox people who participate in these kinds of prayer services often find that they can no longer be part of Orthodox services where women are relegated to "traditional" roles.

== Orthodox discourse on "permissibility" according to Jewish law ==
Public women's prayer services, as well as women's participation in standard public services, are both innovations over the past generation. Many rabbis have weighed in on their permissibility. The permitting rabbis have interpreted various earlier talmudic and halachic sources to either provide conceptual or indirect support for public women's prayer. Other rabbis have analyzed these arguments, and raised various forms of refutation.

=== Support for partnership minyanim ===
The existence of partnership minyanim was preceded by an opinion by Modern Orthodox Rabbi Mendel Shapiro in 2001, subsequently joined by Bar-Ilan University Talmud Professor Rabbi Daniel Sperber, positing that halakha (Jewish law) permits Orthodox women to be called to, and to read from, the Torah on Shabbat under certain conditions. These opinions rely on earlier authorities including the Magen Avraham. Dr. Joel B. Wolowelsky also expressed an opinion which, while not offering a formal opinion on the halachic issues, suggested that the partnership minyan enterprise was not necessarily inconsistent with an Orthodox hashkafah (outlook).

==== Rabbi Mendel Shapiro ====
Rabbi Shapiro's analysis focused on a Baraita in the Babylonian Talmud stating that:

The Rabbis taught (teno) that anyone can be numbered among the seven [called to the Torah on Shabbat], even a minor, even a woman. But the Sages said that we do not call a woman to the Torah because of Kevod HaTzibur (the dignity of the congregation). (Megillah 23a).

Rabbi Shapiro's primary argument, based on the language of this baraita as well as traditional commentaries to it, was that women were only discouraged from performing public Torah reading based on a social concern for the dignity of the congregation ("Kevod HaTzibur"). While Jewish law usually demands that public rituals be led by those who are obligated in that particular ritual- and women are generally considered to be not obligated in public Torah reading- R. Shapiro demonstrated that public Torah reading is an exception, based on the baraita's explicitly allowing a minor, who is also not obligated, to lead. therefore, he argued, only "the dignity of the congregation" was invoked to discourage women from reading. He then analyzed the weight of the "dignity of the congregation" prohibition. Analyzing authorities on the law of Kevod HaTzibur, he noted a number of other situations which were rabbinically prohibited due to the "dignity of the congregation", such as rolling a Torah scroll in front of the congregation or having a person too young to have a beard serve as Hazzan. Citing authorities who held that congregational dignity could be waived in some of these matters, including the common practice of having teenagers lead the congregation in contemporary synagogues, he concluded that a congregation could waive its dignity on this issue as well, and an Orthodox congregation choosing to do so could call a woman to the Torah in much the same way that it could choose to have a teenager lead prayers at a Bar Mitzvah. Rabbi Shapiro also briefly addressed certain other objections, arguing for example that because some authorities have held that women can read the Megilla on Purim to men, chanting the Megilla, and hence the Torah, is not a kind of singing subject to restrictions on the issue of kol isha, the female singing voice.

==== Rabbi Daniel Sperber ====
Rabbi Sperber agreed with Rabbi Shapiro's argument that the baraita in Megillah 23a indicated that the Sages instituted "we do not call a woman" as a later prohibition, and that calling a woman was originally permitted. He focused on the concept of Kevod HaBriyot ("human dignity"), a Talmudic concept by which rabbinical prohibitions are sometimes waived in order to preserve honor or dignity. Noting that the concept had received modern applications by Orthodox decisors including an opinion by Rabbi Eliezer Waldenberg permitting wearing a hearing aid on Shabbat (based on a Talmudic opinion overriding the rabbinic prohibition against carrying on Shabbat to permit a person needing to defecate to carry wiping material), Rabbi Shapiro argued that the Kevod HaBriyot concept could be applied to override the rabbinic prohibition against calling women to the Torah on grounds of human dignity or respect.

==== Dr. Joel B. Wolowelsky ====
Dr. Joel B. Wolowelsky wrote that although the Talmud appears to have an iron-clad rule that a Kohen should always be called to the Torah first and early practice gave precedence to Torah scholars, the Magen Avraham proposed the then-novel idea that individuals observing special occasions, such as a wedding or Bar Mitzvah, should have precedence. The Magen Avraham's view eventually prevailed, and subsequent commentators, including Rabbi Ovadiah Yosef, developed his ideas to the point of creating various exceptions under which a Yisrael observing a special occasion could sometimes be called first even if a Kohen is present and refuses to waive the first aliyah. Observing that it is important to be able to tell whether a new approach can be considered a legitimate effort to develop the tradition or an illegitimate attempt to manipulate it, he suggested that changes in traditional concepts of respect involved in the idea of sometimes calling a woman to the Torah based on the Magen Avraham's ideas, may not necessarily be any more radical or threatening to the tradition, from a hashkfic (outlook or worldview) point of view, than the changes involved in developments leading to sometimes not calling a Kohen first.

=== Objections to partnership minyanim ===
Orthodox leaders who express public support for partnership minyan and expanded roles for women are often delegitimized by representatives of the rabbinic establishment speaking on behalf of mainstream or majority of Orthodox Jews. In some cases, rabbis supporting partnership minyan have been publicly humiliated and privately reprimanded, threatened with losing their status within rabbinic organizations or in one case even losing his title as rabbi. Below is a sampling of the rabbinic arguments against partnership minyan.

==== Orthodox objections ====
===== Rabbi Yehudah Herzl Henkin =====
Rabbi Yehudah Herzl Henkin objected to Rabbi Shapiro's claims, but the core of his argument was not about halakha but about social practices. In addition to point-by-point halakhic counterarguments, he also said:

Regardless of the arguments that can be proffered to permit women's aliyot [Torah-reading] today—that kevod ha-tsibbur can be waived, that it does not apply today when everyone is literate, that it does not apply when the olim rely on the (male) ba`al qeri’ah and do not themselves read—women's aliyot remain outside the consensus, and a congregation that institutes them is not Orthodox in name and will not long remain Orthodox in practice. In my judgement, this is an accurate statement now and for the foreseeable future, and I see no point in arguing about it.

===== Rabbi Ephraim Mirvis =====
In 2013 British Chief Rabbi Ephraim Mirvis stated that a partnership minyan service was not something which could take place in synagogues under his auspices.

Rabbi Mirvis noted that this view was one unanimously held by every posek (halachic decisor) in the world.

===== Rabbi/Dr. Gidon Rothstein =====
Rabbi/Dr. Gidon Rothstein (author of Murderer in the Mikdash), in an article in the Rabbinical Council of America's journal Tradition, analyzed Rabbi Shapiro's arguments and concluded that

the attempt to read the talmudic concerns about women's aliyot out of relevance to contemporary Orthodox Jews has not meaningfully succeeded.

Among other arguments, Rabbi Rothstein argued that even according to the lenient opinions that congregations can waive their "dignity", they can do so only on a temporary and situational basis, or as a concession to a particular circumstance after the fact, but not on a permanent basis. Even having a teenager as a regular Hazzan is not comparable, because:

Appointing a young cantor is a more regularized foregoing of waiving, but only until he matures; as Abba Eban once said when asked about the low median age of the State of Israel, it is a problem that passes with time. In each case other than R. Shapiro's, the foregoing is temporary and situational.

Rabbi Rothstein also argued that only a few of the medieval commentators held that a woman could intrinsically read all the aliyot, that most held they could read only some and some major authorities held they could read only the last one. He argued that the authorities who held a woman could read only the last aliyah "carry greater weight" than the authorities who held they could read more:

As he [R. Shapiro] presents it, Or Zaru’a and R. David Pardo would allow women to read any or all of the portions of the Torah reading, R. Isaiah de-Trani (Rid) would allow four or three aliyyot, R. Jacob Emden would only allow women to read where no men are capable of doing so, and R. Meir ha-Kohen of Rothenburg (Hagahot Maimoniyot) only allows their reading the seventh.

Later, he notes that Ran and Rivash were the source of Rema's claim that women could not be called up to read all the portions of the Torah. Ran's comment is ambiguous (so that he might agree that they could take any three aliyyot), but Rivash assumes that Ran agreed with him that women could only take the seventh or, perhaps, the reading added on for the maftir. Further, when Hagahot Maimoniyot limits slaves to the seventh portion, the comment closes by citing his teacher, the more famous R. Meir of Rothenburg.

I mention the names because the halakhic process operates with a hierarchy of authority and influence. All other things being equal, Maharam of Rothenburg, Ran, and Rivash carry greater weight in a traditional halakhic discussion than any of the others cited.

Rabbi Rothstein concluded, therefore, that "granting all of Rabbi Shapiros points still only supports women reading the seventh portion."

Rabbi Rothstein also argued that women are not members of the public community with respect to Torah reading, and the dignity of the community would be affronted by "outsourcing" obligations to non-members:

The most plausible suggestion is that having women read the Torah affronts communal "dignity" because they are not generally members of the obligated public community. Relying on someone who is not usually—and in the case of Torah reading, not at all—a member of the public community suggests that the regular members were either unable or chose not to shoulder their communal responsibilities (out of ignorance or apathy). Outsourcing obligations betrays an undignified attitude toward the obligation itself; educating future members of the congregation does not.

===== Articles in The Forward =====
An article in The Forward (September 20, 2002) summarized Orthodox views immediately following the initial partnership minyan congregations:

No leading Orthodox institution or halachic arbiter is known to have publicly endorsed the new prayer groups or Shapiro's article. At the same time, the new practices have yet to be condemned by Modern Orthodoxy's leading institutions. But insiders attributed the institutional silence to the trend being in its early stages, and said the changes were likely to be criticized by leading Orthodox rabbis. This was later proven to be true.

Even Edah director Rabbi Saul Berman, who agreed to publish Shapiro's article in the spirit of open debate, said he could not accept its conclusions.

When asked if such a minyan would be granted membership in the Orthodox Union, the union's professional head, Rabbi Tzvi Hersh Weinreb, said that the matter would be referred to outside religious authorities, including the Rabbinical Council of America. The RCA's executive vice president, Rabbi Stephen Dworken, said that if the issue is ever raised, his organization would have to study it. Dworken added that he did not know of any "halachic authority who permits those types of activities."

Rabbi Yosef Blau, a spiritual adviser to students at Modern Orthodoxy's flagship Yeshiva University, said that Y.U. and its affiliated seminary rarely adopt official policies regulating where students are allowed to worship, though they are expected to follow Orthodox teachings. But, he added, even when top members of the Y.U. rabbinical faculty do come out against a controversial practice, such as women-only prayer groups involving Torah reading, graduates often continue to chart their own course without being sanctioned.

Blau predicted that the current phenomenon was likely to generate more controversy than women's prayer groups if the practice becomes more widespread. He added that most Y.U. rabbis probably would object. In a thinly veiled reference to Shapiro, Blau said that no widely respected halachic arbiter had endorsed the recent attempts to expand women's roles

A later Forward article (March 5, 2014) suggested that Orthodox authorities "have taken aim at the growing phenomenon of partnership minyans," citing many recent statements and articles by Orthodox rabbis and scholars and a reported incident where a rabbinical student at Yeshiva University was reprimanded for hosting a partnership minyan. According to the article, "the only institution in the country that seems open to the minyans is Yeshivat Chovevei Torah," a controversial rabbinical seminary in Riverdale.

===== Rabbi Yaakov Ariel =====
Rabbi Yaakov Ariel, the chief rabbi of Ramat Gan, criticized these minyanim in Hazofe, arguing that they do not conform to Jewish law or to Orthodox ideals of prayer, in which men and women must be kept separate at all times. In his critique, Rabbi Ariel wrote that the violation of the "dignity of the congregation" involved refers to the sexual distraction that would be experienced if men and women were not kept separate. He argued that because this sexual distraction is part of human nature, waiving it is out of the question. He also wrote that there could be a problem of kol isha (hearing a woman's singing voice). He argued that partnership minyanim would cause a dispute that would result in a split in the orthodox community, and that women's participation harms the sacredness of the synagogue. Elitzur Bar-Asher wrote a rebuttal.

===== Rabbi Aryeh A. Frimer =====
Rabbi Aryeh A. Frimer, author of a number of scholarly works on the status of women in Orthodox halakha including Women and Minyan, wrote a critique of Rabbi Sperber's arguments in the blog post he entitled "Lo Zu haDerekh: A Review of Rabbi Prof. Daniel Sperber's Darka shel Halakha".

Rabbi Frimer briefly critiqued Mendal Shapiro's argument that kevod hatzibur can be waived, arguing that it was unwaivable both because women have been exempted from prominent communal roles out of considerations of modesty, and because since in his view women are not obligated to read while men are, women cannot fulfill the obligation for men.

Rabbi Frimer had two main disagreements with Rabbi Daniel Sperber. His first disagreement was with R. Sperber's view that the Beraita in Megilla 23a ("but the sages say we do not call a woman...") reflected only a recommendation or advice. He marshalled authorities who held that it was obligatory with permission a leniency available only for an emergency. In his view these authorities had the better argument.

Rabbi Frimer's second and what he characterized as his most important objection was to R. Sperber's argument that kevod hatzibur could be overridden by the principle of kevod habriyot. He strongly objected to the idea of kevod habriyot overriding a rabbinic decree in its entirety, arguing that the kind of embarrassment or shame that would make it possible to invoke kevod habriyot had to come from factors (such as excrement or nakedness) external to the decree that occurred only in limited circumstances. He argued that a rabbinic decree cannot itself be regarded as shameful or embarrassing. To permit a rabbinic prohibition to be characterized as an embarrassment, R. Frimer argued, would give anyone "carte blanch" to abrogate any Rabbinic prohibition simply by saying "This offends me." He said that "Such a position is untenable, if not unthinkable." Accordingly, he argued that "kevod ha-beriyyot cannot be invoked to nullify a rabbinic commandment, where the shame comes from the very fulfillment of the rabbinic injunction itself."

Take for example one who is invited to dine with his colleagues or clients, would we allow him to avoid embarrassment by eating fruit and vegetables from which terumot and ma'asrot (which nowadays is Rabbinic) have not been removed, or by consuming hamets she-avar alav haPesah, or by drinking Stam yeynam (wine touched or poured by a non-Jew). Or alternatively, suppose someone is at a meeting and is ashamed to walk out in order to daven Minha. And what about prayers at the airport in between flights. Would we allow him to forgo his rabbinic prayer obligation because of this embarrassment? The answer is that in those cases where acting according to halakha—be it to not eat terumot and ma’asrot, or to not drink stam yeynam, or to fulfill ones prayer obligation—creates the embarrassment, then kevod ha-beriyyot cannot set aside the Rabbinic prohibition. One should be proud to be fulfilling the halakha.

After noting that R. Sperber "did what a Torah scholar is supposed to do" in making a creative suggestion and presenting it to the scholarly community for criticism and discussion, R. Frimer finished by criticizing those attempting to enact R. Sperber's views into practice immediately. "Considering the novelty of this innovation, religious integrity and sensitivity requires serious consultation with renowned halakhic authorities of recognized stature—prior to acting on such a significant departure from normative halakha." He concluded with a reflection that "the halakhic process is a search for truth—Divine truth" and stressed the importance of not adapting an approach "simply because it yields the desired result."

=== Liberal objections ===
For some liberal Jews, partnership minyan does not go far enough in its drive towards gender equality. Because liturgical roles in partnership minyanim are still divided by gender, some liberal Jews find partnership minyanim are not egalitarian enough. The Reform and Reconstructionist movements, as well as most of Conservative Judaism, grant men and women identical roles in their synagogues, services, and leadership.

A test of the Partnership Minyan format at the Wesleyan University Hillel in 2005 led to significant objections among non-Orthodox students, with sophomore Erica Belkin calling it "a test of how far the Jewish community's pluralism and tolerance would extend" and junior Daniella Schmidt stating that "At Wesleyan, we make an effort to provide safe spaces for everyone, including those who prefer orthodox traditions like the mechitza. However, these traditions should not come at the expense of others' safe space and inclusion."

== Halachic Minyan guide ==
In February 2008, Elitzur and Michal Bar-Asher Siegel released a guide to partnership minyanim called Halachic Minyan which the Jerusalem Post characterized as "the first official guide of its kind". The Bar-Asher Siegels were advisors to Minyan Tehillah in Cambridge, Massachusetts.

The guide, in addition to covering the issues of Torah reading and Shabbat services covered by the Shapiro and Sperber opinions, outlined women's participation in a variety of additional areas, the third aliyah to a daily Torah reading; serving as gabbai for a Torah reading; leading kabbalat shabbat and pseukei d'zimra, the tekiot for blowing the Shofar, leading piyuttim during the repetition of the High Holiday Amidah, and other areas. Audrey Trachtman, a board member of the Jewish Orthodox Feminist Alliance, characterized it as "an exciting and important step" but as "a discussion, not intended to be uniform practice."

According to the Jerusalem Post, Ramat Gan Chief Rabbi Ya'acov Ariel responded to the publication of the guide by repeating a prohibition against taking part in a partnership minyan, saying that doing so is prohibited by Jewish law.

Alan Haber wrote an op-ed editorial in the Jerusalem Post criticizing the guide. He argued that the guide is "not a work of halacha" because:

- The guide "[utilizes] sources selectively and partially, without regard to majority opinion or precedent."
- It sometimes "[issues] rulings in express contradiction to the conclusion drawn by the authorities they cite as proof."
- It assesses sources tendentiously, seeking to find sources to justify a pre-determined agenda rather than to neutrally discern the intent of the earlier authorities.
- Its authors are not rabbis, and are seeking to determine by lay decision-making matters on which Rabbinic Judaism defers to rabbis.

Calling this last point a "much more fundamental deficiency", Haber wrote that:

More than anything else, Halacha requires submission to the authority of poskim—halachic decisors. One is free to choose a halachic authority who shares one's world view, and there is also room for debate about the exact scope and extent of the posek's authority. But Halacha is a system of law based on commandments; it is not source material for independent decision-making.

== Sociological research ==
Dr. Elana Maryles Sztokman, in her book The Men's Section: Orthodox Jewish men in an Egalitarian World conducted research into the identities and tensions among men who belong to partnership minyans. She found that many Orthodox Jewish men choose to attend these settings due to dissatisfaction with the ways in which Orthodoxy socializes men into constructs of masculinities. Orthodoxy, according to the research, constructs a masculinity that is rooted in obedience, unquestioning performance, emotionlessless, conformity, and elitism. Men who attend partnership minyans are often disillusioned from those constructs and seek a space where they are welcome to think and act for themselves, to be warm and inclusive, to challenge socially-accepted conventions within Orthodox synagogues, and to act out a less exclusively-cerebral and more humanely emotional-spiritual variation of Jewish masculinity. This book won the 2012 National Jewish Book Council Award.

== Issues and perspectives in application ==
In the JOFA 10th Anniversary International Conference on Feminism & Orthodoxy (February 10–11, 2007), three members of these minyanim (Elitzur Bar-Asher, Michal Bar-Asher Siegal and Alanna Cooper), in a session under the title "Beyond Women's Issues: Partnership Minyanim Engages Orthodoxy", discussed issues they encountered and approaches to resolving them in implementing this style of worship, as well as their personal ideological approaches.

== See also ==
- Chazante
- Shira Hadasha
- Modern Orthodox Judaism
- Jewish Orthodox Feminist Alliance
- Role of women in Judaism
- Jewish feminism
- Mendel Shapiro
- Daniel Sperber
- Minyan
- Torah reading
- Jewish services
- Aryeh Frimer
