= Gil Student =

American writer (born 1972)

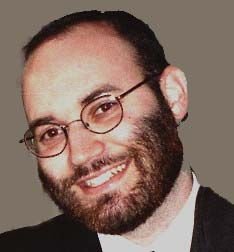
- Born: August 8, 1972 (age 54)
- Occupations: Finance, Publisher, blogger

Gil Ofer Student (born August 8, 1972) is the former Book Editor of the Orthodox Union's Jewish Action magazine, former Managing Editor of OU Press, and an Orthodox Jewish blogger who writes about the interface between different facets of Judaism, specifically Orthodox Judaism and Modern Orthodox Judaism. He is an ordained non-pulpit serving Orthodox rabbi who serves as a member of the Editorial Committee of the Orthodox Union's Jewish Action magazine and the Director of the Halacha Commission of the Rabbinical Alliance of America. He is currently serving on his third term as a member of the Executive Committee of the Rabbinical Council of America.

== Biography ==
Student was raised in Teaneck, New Jersey, where his parents still live. In his youth, he attended a Conservative Jewish synagogue. He is an alumnus of Solomon Schechter elementary school and Frisch School and a baal teshuva. He is a 1994 graduate of Yeshiva College and was listed in the 2005 alumni directory as a rabbi and a quantitative analyst working in financial reinsurance. Student lives in the Marine Park section of Brooklyn, New York, and has served as president of Khilah Marine Park synagogue led by Rabbi Baruch Pesach Mendelson. He is married and has four children and three grandchildren.

== Writing, blogging and publishing ==
Student's writings appear mainly on the Internet on his old and his new blog, Hirhurim Musings. They also appear in newspapers and journals on a variety of Judaic topics including Jewish medical ethics and Yeshiva University.

The Hirhurim blog was ranked "Best Jewish Religion Blog" and #3 in categories "Best Series" and "Best Overall Blog" for 2005 by The Jerusalem Post and has been cited in The Wall Street Journal for declining to run an ad for "Letter to a Christian Nation" by Sam Harris. He has received other recognition for his blogging and views by Yeshiva University's student newspapers The Commentator and The Observer.

On August 1, 2013, Student announced that he was closing his blog stating: "I believe Hirhurim has run its course ... In my opinion, the ideas and dialogue have gotten stale ... It is time to move on to a new mission and format." The website later relaunched and now states: "Torah Musings is a window into the Orthodox Jewish intellectual's world, providing sophisticated but popular textual studies, important news stories and associated commentary from the perspective of an Orthodox Judaism that is intellectually open and halakhically conservative."

Student founded and operated a now-defunct small Jewish publishing house, Yashar Books, that, in addition to traditional Orthodox scholarly works, used to distribute the writings of Orthodox thinkers who defy the accepted norms of publications in the Haredi world; the latter include works that were previously distributed by prominent publishers such as Feldheim.

His publishing company has undertaken to distribute the works of Rabbi Natan Slifkin whose books were banned by many Haredi rabbis as well as other works that are not openly approved by the Haredi mainstream rabbinate. In explaining his defense of Slifkin and his willingness to publish Slifkin's books, Student wrote in The Jewish Press, "The Jewish community is no stranger to conflict. Some controversies, however, transcend their local concern and reverberate in ways originally unintended. I believe we have witnessed such an event with the recent controversy surrounding three books about Torah and science by Rabbi Natan (Nosson) Slifkin. The bans promulgated on his books have come to represent more than just disapproval of those specific works; they have come to signify the lack of centralized rabbinic authority in our globalized world and the increased empowerment of the individual afforded by the Internet."

== Defending the Talmud ==
Student has written defending the Talmud against those who claim that it defames gentiles or Jesus. On the Internet, one of Student's sites called "Talmud: The Real Truth About The Talmud" states its objective:

There are many lies circulating the internet about the Jewish Talmud. These allegations are supported by "direct quotations" from the Talmud that are frequently wrong or taken out of context. However, most people lack the scholarly background to verify these claims. Most people have no way of knowing that these accusation are false and malicious. What we are attempting is to demonstrate in detail how these accusations are both wrong and intentionally misleading. We are trying to show to the world the real truth about the Talmud.

Key areas discussed with relevant sources include:

- About the Talmud
- Alleged racism in the Talmud
- Talmud's view of Jesus' personalities.
- Jewish holidays
- Immorality in the Talmud

== Position on Modern and Haredi Orthodoxy ==
Though his stance in the Slifkin controversy put him at odds with much of the Haredi world, Student nevertheless opposes many trends within Modern Orthodoxy, especially regarding women's issues (e.g. women's prayer groups), taking a particularly strong stance against the now-defunct Edah organization; and other groups.

In his personal life, Student remains involved with both the Haredi and Modern Orthodox worlds in Brooklyn. According to Student, "I live in a moderate Haredi neighborhood, attend Haredi synagogues, send my children to moderate Haredi schools but still maintain professional and friendly relations with the Modern Orthodox world."

== Critique of Lubavitch messianism ==
He has written on Chabad messianism in opposition to the claim by some Chabad Hasidim that the last Lubavitcher Rebbe, Menachem Mendel Schneerson, may have been the long-awaited Jewish Messiah (i.e., the Moshiach).

He has received both criticism and praise for his self-published book Can The Rebbe Be Moshiach? described as "Proofs from Gemara, Midrash, and Rambam that the Lubavitcher Rebbe cannot be Moshiach".

In an interview with The Jewish Press in September 2009, in response to a question if he can talk about his opinions on the Lubavitcher rebbe not being Moshiach, he replied,

I actually prefer not to. People get very offended by it. I wrote the book for ba'alei teshuvah to let them know that there's more than one perspective on the issue. I have no interest in fighting with Lubavitch.

== Attention on the Internet ==
Student is often cited by rabbis belonging to the Rabbinical Council of America, and eminent writers frequently respond to Student's writings and statements on their own websites and blogs. Richard John Neuhaus, responding to a blog post by Student on the New American Bible, writes:

Over on a blog called Hirhurim Musings, a Torah scholar by the name of Gil Student takes on my critique of the Catholic translation known as the New American Bible (NAB) in the current issue of FIRST THINGS. He admits that he's not familiar with the NAB and is, in fact, not much interested in English translations of the Bible, but, picking up on some of the examples I cite in my essay 'Bible Babel,' he comes to the defense of the NAB translators.

The publishers of American Theocracy, discussing the role of women in Judaism, write, "Rabbi Gil Student's Hirhurim Musings, described as the Best Jewish Religion Blog of 2005 by the Jerusalem Post, had this to say on December 31, 2004: 'It must be remembered that a substantial segment of the Orthodox community considers the advanced learning of the Torah by women to be forbidden.'"

== See also ==
- Religion and the Internet
