= Mendel Shapiro =

Mendel Shapiro is a Jerusalem lawyer and Modern Orthodox Rabbi. He is the author of a halakhic analysis arguing that women could be called to read from the Torah in prayer services with men on Shabbat under certain conditions. His minority viewpoint, which contravened both tradition, and according to many poskim Halacha itself, became the subject of extensive dispute within the Modern Orthodox Jewish world. Gidon Rothstein wrote in the Rabbinical Council of America's flagship journal Tradition that

Both for its inherent interest as an attempt to mine sources creatively and for its impact on the current Orthodox world, R. Shapiro's analysis deserves serious consideration.

However, Rothstein went on to critique all of Shapiro's core arguments, saying they have "conspicuously weak textual support," and concluded that Shapiro's analysis "has not meaningfully succeeded".

Shapiro holds B.A. and M.S. degrees from Yeshiva University and a J.D. from Columbia Law School. He received Semicha (Rabbinic Ordination) from the Rabbi Isaac Elchanan Theological Seminary of Yeshiva University.

== See also ==
- Shira Hadasha
- Partnership minyan
