= 19.99 =

19.99 may refer to:

- 19.99 (album), 1998 album by M.O.T.
- 19.99 (EP), 2024 EP by BoyNextDoor

== See also ==
- 1999 (disambiguation)
