= Hillel Tigay =

American musician

- Born: 1969 (age 56–57)
- Education: University of Pennsylvania
- Years active: 1990s–present
- Employer: IKAR

Hillel Tigay (born 1969), formerly performing as Dr. Dreidle, is an American musician and chazzan. Influenced by rock, alternative, Spanish, and Middle Eastern music in his childhood, Tigay studied musicology at the University of Pennsylvania before leaving to Los Angeles in the hope of starting a music career. His initial stints with A&M Records and Jewish rap group M.O.T. were unsuccessful, but in 2005, Tigay found success as the chazzan and music director of IKAR, a Jewish congregation. From the IKAR Music Lab, and with the help of congregants influential in the music industry, Tigay has released several albums and launched his own music group, Palms Station.

== Life and career ==
Hillel Tigay was influenced by music from an early age, deciding to learn guitar after hearing the Beatles' Abbey Road at the age of 11. Other early influences include Tears for Fears, the Who, and Led Zeppelin, as well as Middle Eastern and Sephardic music he recounted picking up while visiting Israel. He studied musicology at the University of Pennsylvania, where he studied the sitar and the lute and played in a Renaissance troupe and a balalaika orchestra. He also studied abroad in Spain, learning classical guitar. Tigay left college during his last semester for Los Angeles in an attempt to secure a record deal. He initially scored one with A&M Records through David Anderle, recording one album before being dropped when new leadership took over a year later. He then joined a Jewish rap group called M.O.T. in the late 1990s, performing as Dr. Dreidle alongside companion Ice Berg. M.O.T.'s style of rap heavily involved self-aware Jewish puns, in a style similar to the Beastie Boys. M.O.T. was beset by commercial failure, releasing an album with no marketing budget in the same week as much more popular artists Madonna and Seal.

In 2005, after leaving M.O.T., Tigay was hired by Rabbi Sharon Brous of IKAR to be the congregation's chazzan and musical director. Tigay was initially hesitant; he did not attend services regularly, and recounted to the Jewish Journal that becoming a cantor seemed too close to "going into the family business", as his father was a rabbi. Brous convinced Tigay to join by challenging him to create his own music for IKAR's services, in order to create a service Tigay would want to attend. Initially, Tigay attempted to mimic the style of Shlomo Carlebach, but he grew to dislike the result of that and pursued a different path. Drawing on his own inspirations (excluding techno and hip-hop), Tigay looked to Middle Eastern and Sephardic music for rhythm, while leaving the harmony mostly a function of Western music. Tigay also performs music from other genres, such as Tears for Fears' "Mad World"; him and Brous cite songs like these as part and parcel of their religious practice.

The congregation responded positively to Tigay's music, and members of the congregation helped connect Tigay back to the music industry. With the backing of congregant and music executive Jeff Ayeroff, and as the first project of the IKAR Music Lab, Tigay assembled musicians from a broad array of backgrounds to create his 2012 album Judeo, including Armenian, Iranian, and Turkish traditional instrumentalists and trumpeter Herb Alpert. The album, taking Hebrew and Aramaic prayers for lyrics, is a cross between what music might have sounded like in the antiquity and what Liel Leibovitz of Tablet described as "hyper-contemporary world music". IKAR crowdfunded Tigay's follow-up album, Judeo Vol. II: Alive, exceeding its goal of $35,000. For more secular music, Tigay formed Palms Station, named somewhat after his residence in West Los Angeles. Tigay recorded Palms Station's debut album in his home studio, with his two daughters serving as backup singers.

== Discography ==
=== M.O.T. ===
==== Albums ====
- 19.99 (1998)

=== Palms Station ===
==== Albums ====
- Stand Together. Fall Apart. (2022)

==== Singles ====
- "Alive" (2021)
- "I Don't Know the Way to Your Heart" (2021)
- "I Can't Find You" (2021)
- "(You Can Have) Everything You Wanted" (2021)
- "Amen Hallelujah" (2021)
- "Greater Glory" (2021)
- "I Don't Know the Way to Your Heart (Acoustic)" (2021)
- "I Can't Find You (Acoustic)" (2021)
- "Blue Skies Back (feat. Torii Wolf)" (2022)
- "Jealous All The Time (feat. Torii Wolf)" (2022)
- "Alive (feat. Torii Wolf)" (2022)

=== Solo ===
==== Albums ====
- Judeo (2012)
- Judeo Vol. II: Alive (2020)

==== Singles ====
- "Alive (Radio Edit)" (2020)
- "Echad" (2020)
- "Ozi V'zimrat Yah" (2020)
