= Stand Together (disambiguation) =

Stand Together is an American philanthropic organization established in 2003. Stand Together may also refer to:

- "Stand Together" (Noël Greig song) (1979)
- "Stand Together" (Now United song) (2020)

== See also ==
- All Stand Together, 2023 album by Belgian DJ and record producer Lost Frequencies
- Fight Imperialism–Stand Together, youth group formed in 2004 and affiliated with the Workers World Party
- Stand Together. Fall Apart., (2022) album by Hillel Tigay
- Together We Stand, American sitcom on the CBS network from 1986 to 1987
- "We All Stand Together", song recorded in 1980 and released in 1984 by Paul McCartney
- "When We Stand Together", 2011 song by Nickelback from their album, Here and Now
- Stand (disambiguation)
- Standing Together (disambiguation)
- Together (disambiguation)
