= The Cowboy and the Queen =

2023 documentary film

- Directed by: Andrea Blaugrund Nevins
- Written by: Andrea Blaugrund Nevins; Graham Clark
- Produced by: Andrea Blaugrund Nevins; Graham Clark
- Cinematography: Carmen Delaney; Geoffrey Franklin
- Edited by: Graham Clark
- Music by: Craig Richey
- Production company: Greenwich Pictures Entertainment
- Release date: November 16, 2023 (DOC NYC)
- Running time: 85 minutes
- Country: United States
- Language: English

The Cowboy and the Queen is a 2023 American documentary film about the relationship between horse trainer Monty Roberts and Elizabeth II. The film is written, produced, and directed by Andrea Blaugrund Nevins. It is her final film before her death in 2025.
