= Eric Garcetti =

American diplomat and politician (born 1971)

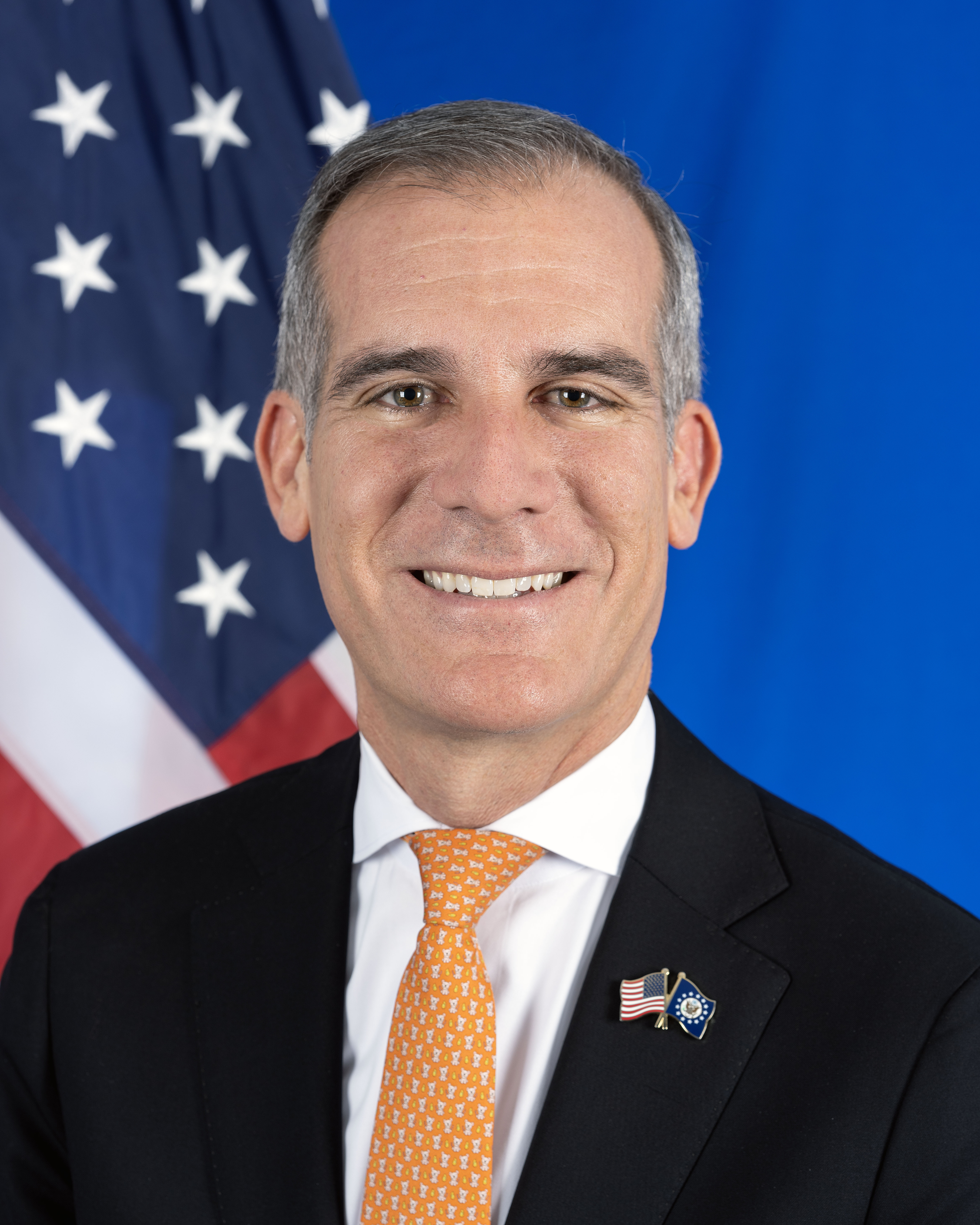
- Official portrait, 2023

26th United States Ambassador to India
- In office May 11, 2023 – January 20, 2025
- President: Joe Biden
- Preceded by: Kenneth I. Juster
- Succeeded by: Sergio Gor

42nd Mayor of Los Angeles
- In office July 1, 2013 – December 12, 2022
- Preceded by: Antonio Villaraigosa
- Succeeded by: Karen Bass

22nd President of the Los Angeles City Council
- In office January 1, 2006 – January 2, 2012
- Preceded by: Alex Padilla
- Succeeded by: Herb Wesson

President pro tempore of the Los Angeles City Council
- In office July 1, 2003 – June 30, 2005
- Preceded by: Cindy Miscikowski
- Succeeded by: Tony Cardenas

Member of the Los Angeles City Council from the 13th district
- In office July 1, 2001 – July 1, 2013
- Preceded by: Jackie Goldberg
- Succeeded by: Mitch O'Farrell

Personal details
- Born: Eric Michael Garcetti; February 4, 1971 (age 55) Los Angeles, California, U.S.
- Party: Democratic
- Spouse: Amy Wakeland (m. 2009)
- Children: 1
- Relatives: Gil Garcetti (father)
- Education: Columbia University (BA, MIA); The Queen's College, Oxford; London School of Economics
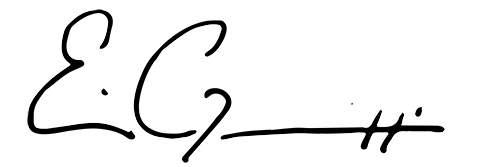
- Signature

Military service
- Allegiance: United States
- Branch/service: United States Navy
- Years of service: 2005–2013
- Rank: Lieutenant
- Unit: Information Dominance Corps; U.S. Navy Reserve
- Eric Garcetti's voice Garcetti's opening statement at his confirmation hearing to be United States ambassador to India; Recorded December 14, 2021

Eric Michael Garcetti (born February 4, 1971) is an American politician and diplomat who served as the United States ambassador to India from 2023 to 2025. He was the 42nd mayor of Los Angeles from 2013 until 2022. A member of the Democratic Party, he was first elected in the 2013 election, and re-elected in 2017. A former member of the Los Angeles City Council, Garcetti served as City Council president from 2006 to 2012. He was the city's first elected Jewish mayor, and its second consecutive Mexican-American mayor. He was elected as the youngest mayor in over 100 years, having been 42 at the time of his inauguration. Upon nomination by President Joe Biden after a previously failed nomination the year before, Garcetti was eventually confirmed as Ambassador to India by the Senate on a 52–42 vote on March 15, 2023.

== Early life and education ==
Eric Michael Garcetti was born on February 4, 1971, in Los Angeles, and was raised in Encino in the San Fernando Valley. He is the son of Sukey (née Roth) and Gil Garcetti, the former Los Angeles County District Attorney.

Garcetti's paternal grandfather, Salvador, was born in Parral, Chihuahua, Mexico. Salvador was brought by his family to the United States as a child after his father, Massimo "Max" Garcetti, was murdered by hanging during the Mexican Revolution. Max had immigrated to Mexico from Italy. He married a Mexican woman and became a judge. His paternal grandmother, Juanita Iberri, was born in Arizona, one of 19 children born to an immigrant father from Sonora, Mexico, and an Arizona-born mother whose father and mother were both Mexican.

Garcetti's maternal grandparents were Russian Jewish immigrants. His maternal grandfather, Harry Roth, founded and ran the clothing brand Louis Roth Clothes. Garcetti's family celebrated Passover and Chanukah, and he attended a Jewish camp.

Garcetti attended elementary school at UCLA Lab School, formerly University Elementary School; and middle and high school at Harvard-Westlake School. While in high school, he was a member of the Junior State of America, a national civic engagement and political debate organization for students.

Garcetti majored in political science and urban planning, and received a Bachelor of Arts from Columbia University in 1992 as a John Jay Scholar. During that time, he lived in Carman Hall and Furnald Hall, served on the student council, was president of the St. Anthony Hall fraternity and literary society, founded the Columbia Urban Experience, and co-wrote and performed in three years of the Varsity Show, a student-written musical. He received a Masters of International Affairs from the School of International and Public Affairs at Columbia University, graduating in 1993.

He met his future wife while they were both studying as Rhodes Scholars at the University of Oxford, he at the Queen's College, Oxford and she at Wadham College, Oxford. While at Oxford, he was a member of the Oxford University L'Chaim Society founded by Rabbi Shmuley Boteach, along with future U.S. senator Cory Booker.

He later began studying for a Ph.D. in ethnicity and Eritrean nationalism at the London School of Economics but as of 2024 does not appear to have ever completed the degree.

== Professional career ==
Prior to his election to the Los Angeles City Council, Garcetti was a visiting instructor of international affairs at the University of Southern California, and an assistant professor of diplomacy and world affairs at Occidental College. His academic work focused on ethnic conflict and nationalism in Southeast Asia and Northeast Africa. During this time, he published articles and chapters of books on post-conflict societies, Eritrean nationalism, and non-violent action. He has served on the California board of Human Rights Watch, and currently serves on the advisory board for Young Storytellers, an arts education nonprofit organization based in Los Angeles. Garcetti is a member of the Inter-American Dialogue. In 2025 he was named Ambassador for Global Climate Diplomacy on behalf of C40 Cities Climate Leadership Group, which he had previously chaired while mayor of Los Angeles.

== Los Angeles City Council (2001–2013) ==
=== Elections ===
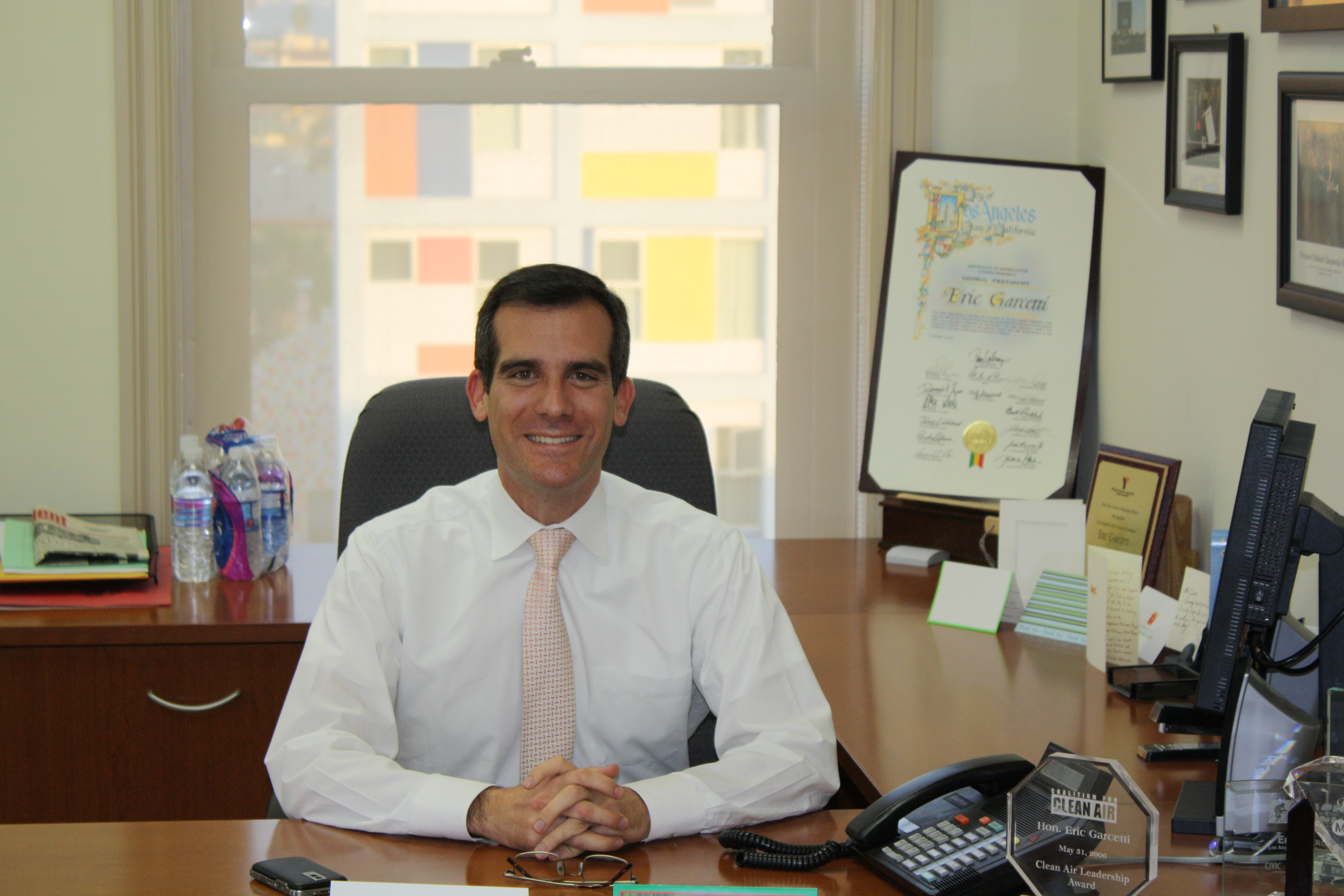
Garcetti in December 2009.

City Council District 13 was left vacant after incumbent Jackie Goldberg was elected to the State Assembly in 2000. Garcetti ran for the open seat and was elected in 2001, narrowly defeating former city council member Michael Woo 52 to 48 percent. He was re-elected again in 2005 (unopposed) and 2009 (with 72% of the vote).

=== Tenure ===
Garcetti served as council president from January 1, 2006, to January 12, 2012. He was elected by his colleagues to succeed Alex Padilla, who resigned after being elected to the California State Senate. He was one of the first elected officials in Los Angeles to hold "office hours" each month, where constituents could meet with him face-to-face. He implemented a "Constituent Bill of Rights" that ensured that constituents' phone calls were returned within a single workday, that constituents are included in all land-use decisions in their neighborhood, and that all constituent concerns are tracked on a computer system that details all actions taken on that particular case. He ensured that the meetings started on time, and all past meetings were made available online. He has also helped more than 1,500 local constituents learn about the governmental process by hosting Government and Planning 101 courses throughout the city.

==== Environmental issues ====
In 2004, Garcetti authored Proposition O, a city stormwater bond which sought to clean the city's waterways. Voters approved the bond with just over 76% of the vote, making it the largest clean water bond in the United States.

In 2005, Garcetti helped found the Los Angeles Neighborhood Land Trust. He authored two of the nation's most far-reaching municipal green building ordinances: the first requires all city buildings to be built to the LEED-certification standard, and the second mandates that all commercial buildings of more than 50,000 sq ft (4,600 m^{2}) in Los Angeles be built to a LEED standard. He supported changes in the city's landscape ordinance and plumbing codes to promote water conservation.

In July 2010, Garcetti, then council president, weakened a 2009 lawn watering ordinance, allowing watering three days per week instead of two. The ordinance restricting watering to two days a week had been passed 13 months earlier by Mayor Antonio Villaraigosa. While it helped the city cut its water use and cope with ongoing drought, the measure was unpopular and was accused of causing pressure fluctuations and water main breaks. A Los Angeles Times editorial said that the city council's changes to the watering ordinance was a "death knell for one of the best collective environmental efforts made by the citizens of Los Angeles".

==== Urban development ====
Garcetti worked to have Historic Filipinotown designated a Preserve America Community. He has also faced public scrutiny for developments that unexpectedly demolished and built over cultural and historic landmarks. One example is three small buildings at historic Sunset Junction that were demolished to make way for a large condominium development, but which in fact remained vacant land for more than a decade. A spokesperson for Garcetti expressed disappointment that the developer took action without first notifying the city council, which had discussed community concerns.

In his district, Garcetti helped create the Neighborhood Leadership Institute, which trains constituents to be active citizens, as well as the Uniting Neighborhoods to Abolish Graffiti (UNTAG) program, which has reduced graffiti in his district over 78% in its first four years.

During his first term, as chair and member of the Housing, Community, and Economic Development Committee, he helped create a $100 million housing trust fund. He has also worked to revitalize the Hollywood area and reform the city business tax.

== Mayor of Los Angeles (2013–2022) ==
Garcetti's portrait in 2013.

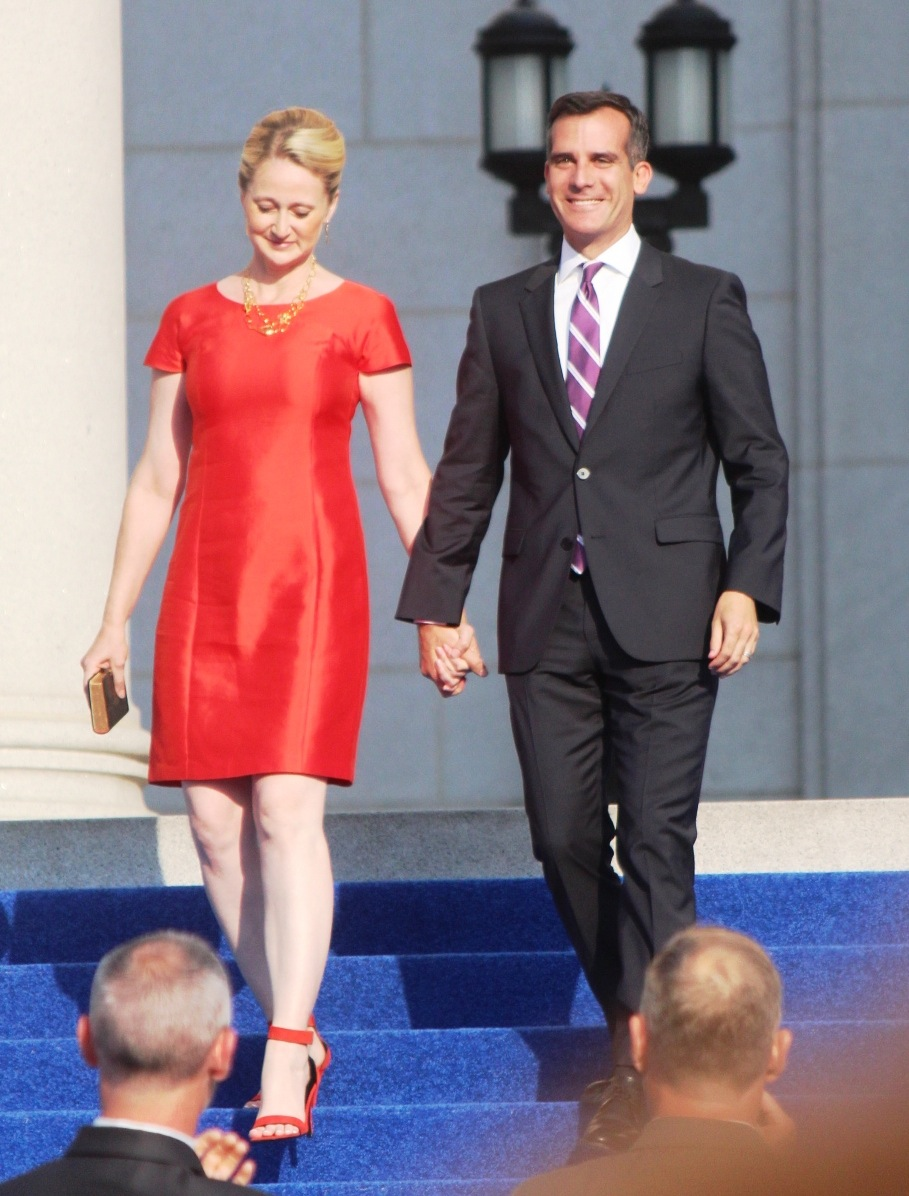
Garcetti with his wife, Amy Elaine Wakeland, in June 2013.

=== Elections ===
With incumbent mayor Antonio Villaraigosa ineligible to run again because of term limits, Garcetti declared his candidacy on September 8, 2011. The election was held on March 5, 2013. As no candidate received a majority of the primary votes to be elected outright, the top two finishers (Garcetti and City Controller Wendy Greuel) advanced to a runoff. Bolstered by the Los Angeles Teachers Union's endorsement, Garcetti was elected on May 21 with 53.9% of the vote, defeating Greuel. The next day, he met with Villaraigosa, who worked with him over the rest of his own tenure to better the transition. Garcetti's term began on July 1, 2013.

Garcetti was re-elected with 81.4% of the vote on March 7, 2017. Although he avoided a runoff election this time, voter turnout was relatively low at 20%. Due to a change in the city's election calendar to align mayoral elections with statewide elections, his second term was to be for five years and six months instead of the usual four years.

=== Tenure ===
Garcetti's tenure as mayor has been described by some authors as both progressive and pragmatic. He cites his method as striking a balance on delivering on liberal goals for the city, while simultaneously taking a more libertarian approach to government reform.

==== Budget policy ====
In a memo in October 2013, Garcetti instructed department heads to develop a "starting point" budget based on the 5% cut from the previous year. In April 2014, he unveiled a "hold-the-line" budget for the coming fiscal year, which proposed modest increases in a number of city services and zero reduction in the business tax. His financial proposal of $8.1 billion required approval from the city council and closed the $242 million gap "in part by relying on increased tax revenue projections and reductions in vacant positions". That August, he announced he would begin his annual review of every city general manager as part of his commitment to improve accountability among Los Angeles officials.

The financial plan assumed the city's workforce, which included police officers and firefighters, would not receive raises in the coming year. One of the proposed changes was to merge the city's police and fire dispatch centers to streamline and improve response time to 911 calls for emergencies and fires. Mayoral aides said such a change would take multiple years to complete. Garcetti said he hoped to increase funding for the Los Angeles Police Department, the department making up nearly 44% of the fund already and most of the increase would go towards new technology for officers. The plan was scheduled to go into effect on July 1, adding eight hours per week to the city's branch library operations. The number of code enforcement officers assigned to look for unpermitted construction and other neighborhood issues, would increase from 25 to 38. He also announced other changes, such as creating a $1.4 million innovation fund to transform city services, breaking the command structure at the Los Angeles Fire Department into four geographic regions, and hiring 140 firefighters to cope with attrition.

==== Economic policy ====
In 2014, Garcetti pushed California Governor Jerry Brown to expand the current film production tax credit (which awarded $100 million annually). He later reported that Brown had agreed to support expanding the tax credit, though it was unclear how large the expansion would be. He wanted $420 million, equal to New York's credit.

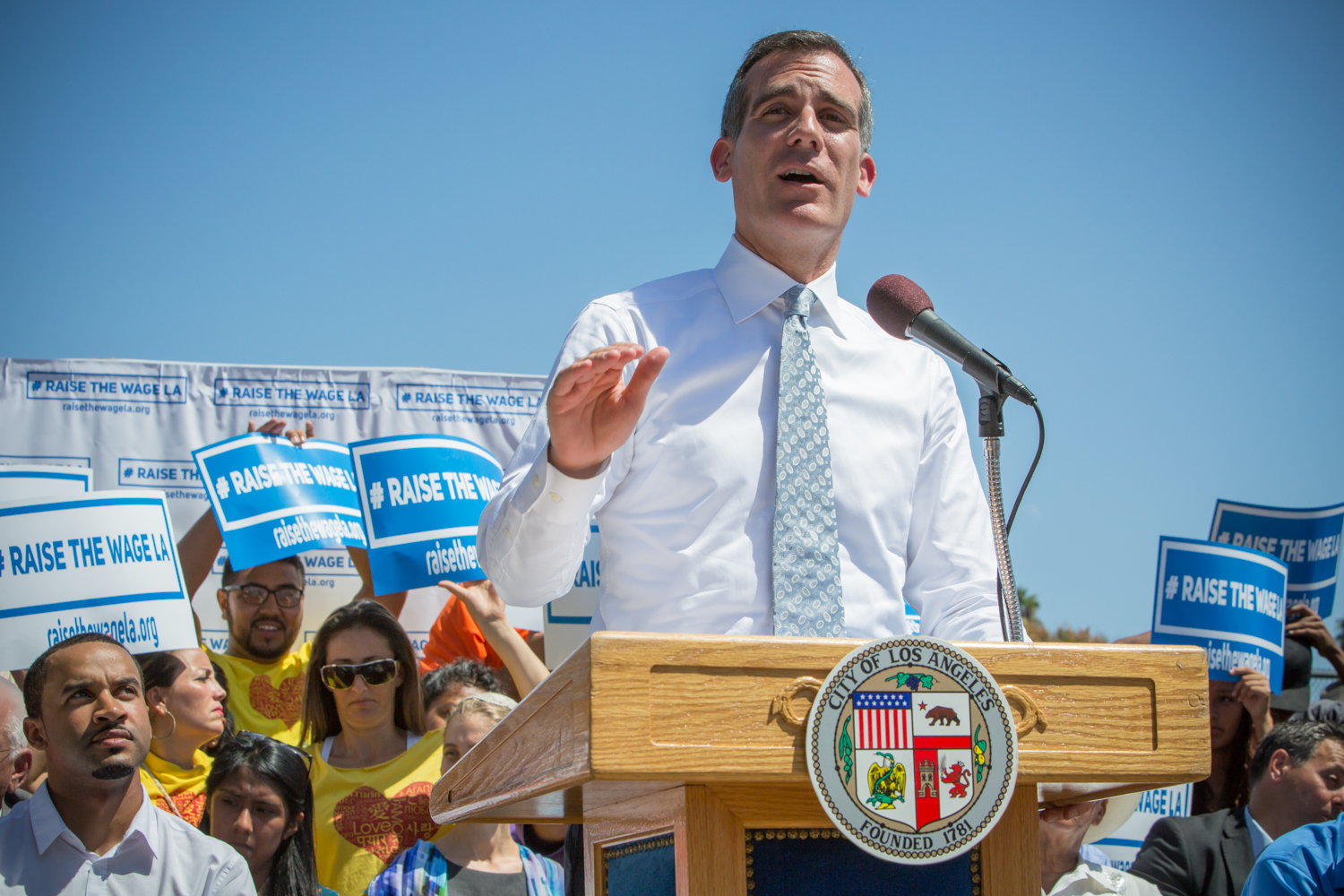
Garcetti speaking at a rally for increasing the minimum wage in 2014

In 2014, Garcetti called for a minimum wage in Los Angeles that could reach $13.25 after three years. He received support from several members of the city council, who would have to approve of the increase. He released an economic analysis, which was prepared by academics at University of California, Berkeley, that stated an "L.A. wage of $13.25—$4.25 more than the state minimum of $9—would significantly improve the lot of low-income workers and impose minimal burdens on business." Business leaders warned that boosting pay too quickly could stifle the slowly rebounding local economy (California's minimum wage then was $9, having increased from $8 on July 1). His proposed ordinance would require businesses to increase workers' pay from the state minimum to at least $10.25 in 2015, $11.75 in 2016 and $13.25 in 2017. Beginning in 2018, additional adjustments in Los Angeles would be automatically tied to an inflation index. Later that month, he expressed his support for the city council to vote on a new citywide law requiring large hotels to pay $15.37 an hour, adding that it would not conflict with his drive to raise the city's minimum wage. He aligned himself with the Fight for 15 movement when he signed legislation in 2015 to gradually raise the minimum wage in Los Angeles to $15 per hour.

==== Homelessness ====
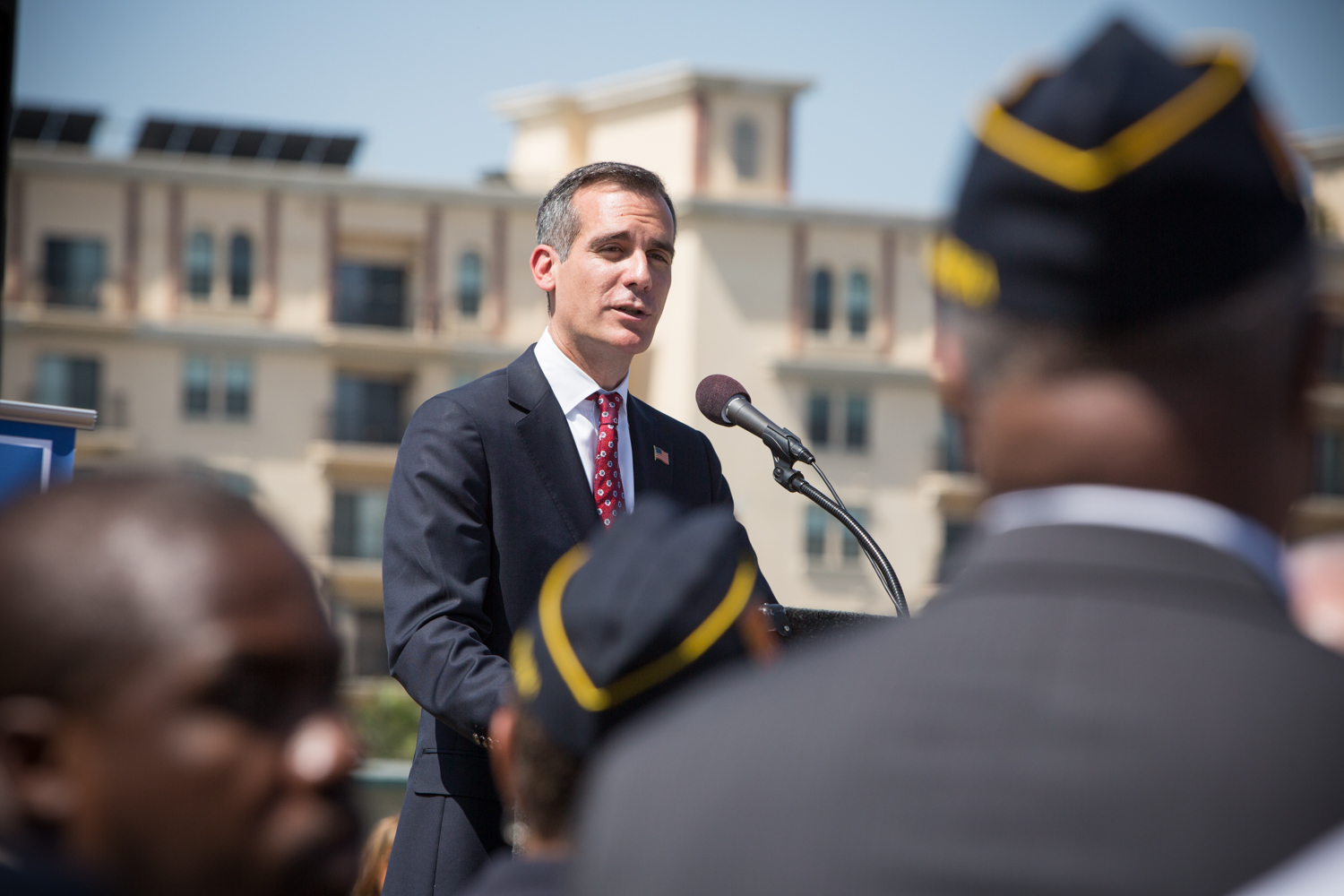
Garcetti celebrating the anniversary of the "10,000 Strong" Veteran Hiring Initiative

In June 2014, while calling the long wait times at the VA's Greater Los Angeles Healthcare System unacceptable, Garcetti pledged to secure 10,000 jobs for veterans by 2017. He also embraced the Obama administration's challenge to end veteran homelessness in Los Angeles within 17 months, stating that he would not accept that "veterans live in our city without a place of their own."

Results from the initiatives have been mixed. On the one hand, the jobs initiative, which offers tax credits to employers who hire veterans, has been generally successful, even surpassing Garcetti's original goal. But the housing initiative has been more complicated to achieve. In a 2017 interview with the Los Angeles Times, Garcetti said that he deserved credit for housing 8,000 veterans, as well as persuading voters to pass Proposition HHH in 2016, which sought to drastically expand the number of apartment units built in the city. However, while the measure was approved overwhelmingly, the funding appropriated by Proposition HHH could potentially fall short of the 10,000 apartment units it was intended to build.

A study released in June 2019 by the Los Angeles Homeless Service Authority (LAHSA) found that homelessness compared to the previous year surged by 16 percent to nearly 60,000 homeless on the streets of Los Angeles. Garcetti responded to the report by saying "Skyrocketing rents statewide and federal disinvestment in affordable housing, combined with an epidemic of untreated trauma and mental illness, is pushing people into homelessness faster than they can be lifted out".

==== Immigration policy ====
In July 2014, Garcetti announced the Los Angeles Police Department would stop honoring most federal requests for detaining arrestees so they can be investigated for deportation. He stated that Los Angeles was joining with other jurisdictions to end the practice of detaining people for being in the United States illegally with no judicial review, and said that the detainment policy was expensive to local government and erodes public trust in the police department. "The federal government has the luxury of waiting to act," he said. "Here at the local level, we are carrying out what the federal government should be doing." Later that month, he confirmed Los Angeles would help shelter immigrant children who have been detained after crossing the border and had begun talks with a federal agency about doing so.

Garcetti worked together with Los Angeles County Supervisor Hilda Solis to create the $10 million L.A. Justice Fund, which provides legal services to illegal immigrants facing deportation. In April 2019, Garcetti opposed President Donald Trump on his plan to release immigrant detainees into sanctuary cities calling his strategy "hateful" and a "waste of time".

==== LAFD relations ====
In 2013, Garcetti pledged that 5% of the Los Angeles Fire Department's firefighters would be women by 2020. As of 2018, 3.1% of the department's firefighters were women.

On March 20, 2014, Garcetti responded to criticism of the department's hiring system that eliminated thousands of qualified applicants by announcing he was canceling the process. He said he had "determined that the Fire Department's recruiting process is fatally flawed". The mayor's office announced that the next scheduled Fire Academy class of 70 cadets would not be held, and that no further hiring would be made from the current civil service list (nearly 25% of the 70 recruits eventually hired were related to LAFD firefighters). It later stated that the RAND Corporation had been asked to help in reforming the recruiting process. The decision was met with a mixed reception.

==== Olympic bid ====
In July 2016, Garcetti was part of a 25-person contingent from Los Angeles to Rio de Janeiro to promote their city's bid for the 2024 Summer Olympics. That November, he led a presentation with six-time gold medalist sprinter Allyson Felix to an array of Olympic leaders and sports officials at a general assembly for the Association of National Olympic Committees in Doha, Qatar.

Ultimately, the International Olympic Committee decided to make Paris the host of the 2024 games, while awarding Los Angeles the 2028 Summer Olympics. In preparation for hosting the games, Garcetti launched the Twenty-eight by '28 initiative, which gives accelerated priority to the city's most crucial transit infrastructure projects. He also appointed former ambassador Nina Hachigian as Deputy Mayor for International Affairs to help coordinate the Olympics as well as broadening the city's global relations in general.

==== Police relations ====
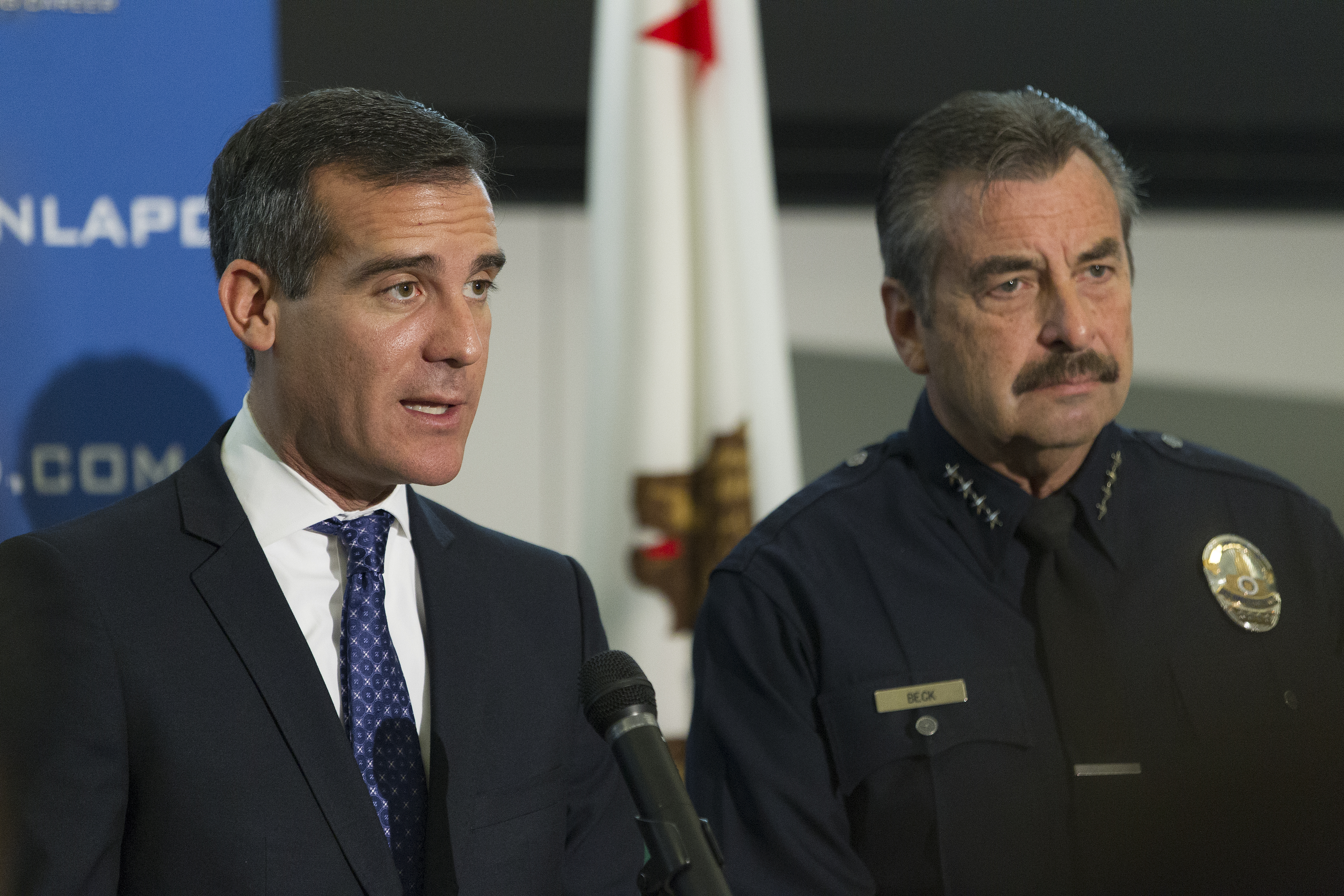
Garcetti with police chief Charlie Beck, discussing crime statistics in 2014

In July 2014, the Los Angeles Police Protective League stated its plans to file an unfair labor practices complaint with the city's Employee Relations Board to block Garcetti and police chief Charlie Beck from discussing directly with officers the proposed a one-year contract that had been previously rejected. The proposal provided $70 million in overtime for that year and $50 million to buy back some of the $120 million in banked overtime while containing no cost-of-living increase.

Protective League President Tyler Izen said that while the union understood the mayor's intentions, he believed speaking directly to the officers could violate fair bargaining rules.

Garcetti found a way around the legal threats by posting a video on YouTube on July 24, noting that under the proposed contract, salaries for officers hired during the recession would be increased and overtime would no longer be given as time off, instead paid in cash. "The sacrifices you made on overtime were emergency measures—never intended to be permanent. And I understand the toll these emergency measures have taken. Not just on your pocketbook but on the LAPD as a whole", Garcetti said.

Other major changes made to the department during Garcetti's tenure include purchasing 7,000 body-worn cameras for the city's patrol officers as well as adding more than 200 officers to the LAPD Metropolitan Division to control the crime rate, which had increased in 2014.

In June 2020, following a campaign by a coalition of community groups including Black Lives Matter, Garcetti announced Los Angeles Police Department budget cuts of $150 million (LAPD was set to receive a large increase in its annual budget from $1.189 billion in 2019 to $1.86 billion in 2020, with most of it going for new police bonuses). Garcetti announced the funds would be redirected to community initiatives.

==== Public utilities ====
Garcetti nominated four new appointees to the Board of Water and Power Commissioners: Jill Banks Barad, Michael F. Fleming, William W. Funderburk Jr., and former congressman Mel Levine. The four commissioners were confirmed by the city council on September 11, 2013, joining Villaraigosa appointee Christina E. Noonan on the panel.

In August 2013, Garcetti said he would sign off on a proposed four-year contract with Los Angeles Department of Water and Power workers. Officials estimated the contract would save $6.1 billion over 30 years. In large part, the deal was expected to save money by cutting the pension benefits of new hires and workers going without raises in pay for three years. The deal was largely worked out before Garcetti took office the previous month; he initially balked at the contract before coming around when negotiators tweaked the proposal to allow for further talks on the issue.

Garcetti accepted the agreement due to provisions, which included a labor-management council to review work rules that add to LADWP workers' salaries, a modified health care system and an added pension tier for new workers and a broadened effort to reduce the disparity in pay with other city workers. In January 2014, he nominated Marcie Edwards to head the Department of Water and Power, who was confirmed on February 21.

==== Race relations ====
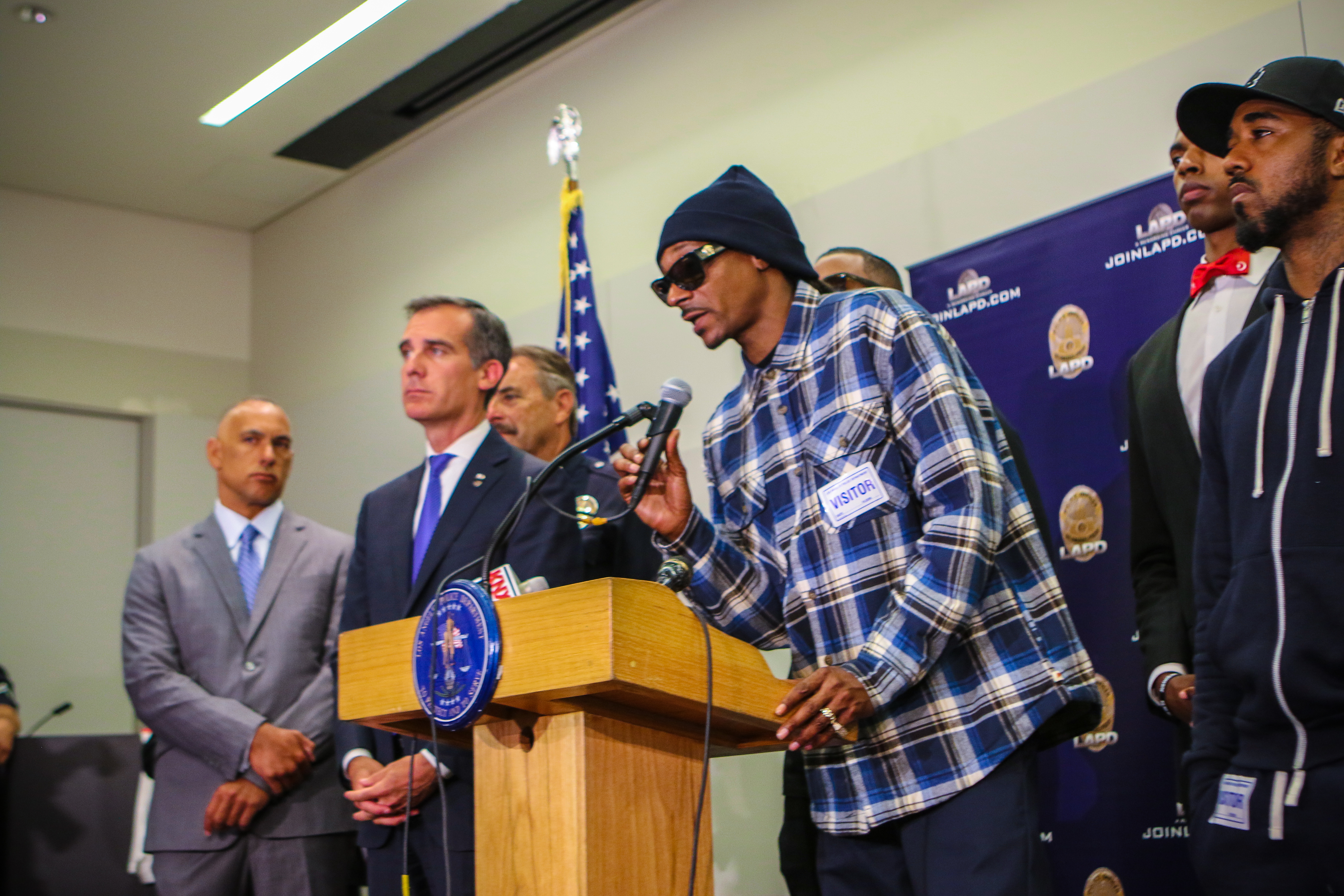
Garcetti with rappers Snoop Dogg and The Game addressing race relations in 2016

In July 2013, Garcetti called for "calm in the streets" after the acquittal of George Zimmerman three days earlier. While acknowledging the similarities between the Zimmerman case and the 1992 Rodney King riots, he insisted the city had come a long way.

In April 2014, the mayor was joined by current and former NBA players to praise the disciplinary actions taken by the league against L.A. Clippers owner Donald Sterling for his publicized racist remarks, saying that the remarks "do not represent Los Angeles". He stated during an interview that the Sterling controversy was "a defining issue" for the city and required a strong response from elected leaders. He stated that he expected Sterling to put up a "long, protracted fight" and that his continued ownership could prove harmful to the franchise.

In May 2014, LAPD officer Shaun Hillmann received a 65-day suspension after recorded remarks of him referring to an African-American man as a "monkey" were aired on television. The next day, Garcetti said Hillmann's statements were "reprehensible" and that the officer should have received a "stiffer" punishment.

In May 2020, Mayor Garcetti joined Rep. Ted Lieu, CNN host Van Jones, and other leaders in civil rights and public service to speak out against racism — including Anti-Asian hate — during the COVID-19 pandemic at an Asia Society forum.

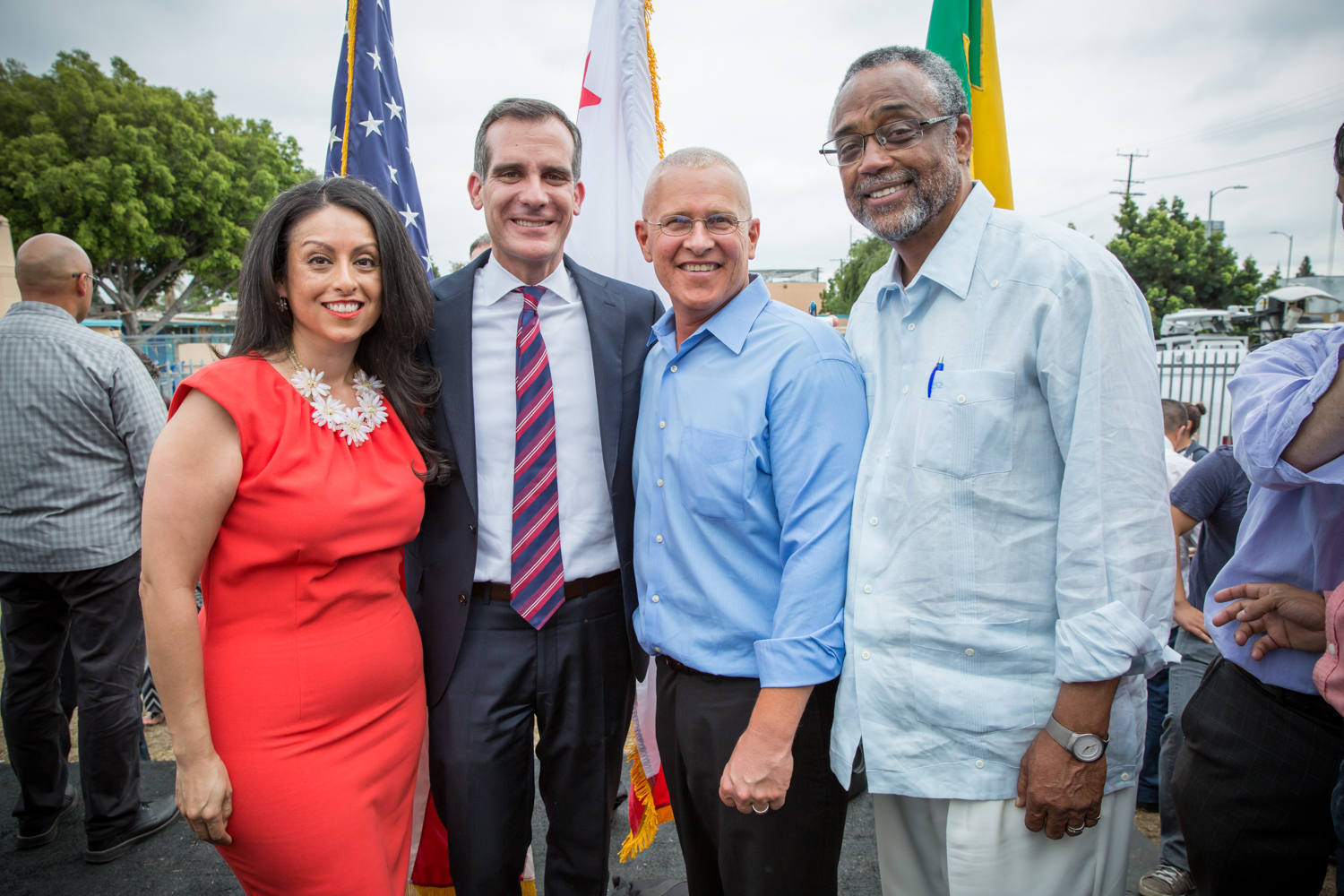
Garcetti with councilmembers Nury Martinez, Mike Bonin and Curren Price, 2015

In June 2021, Garcetti formed Mayors Organized for Reparations and Equity (MORE), a coalition of 11 U.S. mayors dedicated to starting pilot reparations programs in their cities. In conjunction with the formation of MORE, Garcetti formed an advisory commission to develop a pilot reparations program for Black Angelenos.

==== Sustainability ====
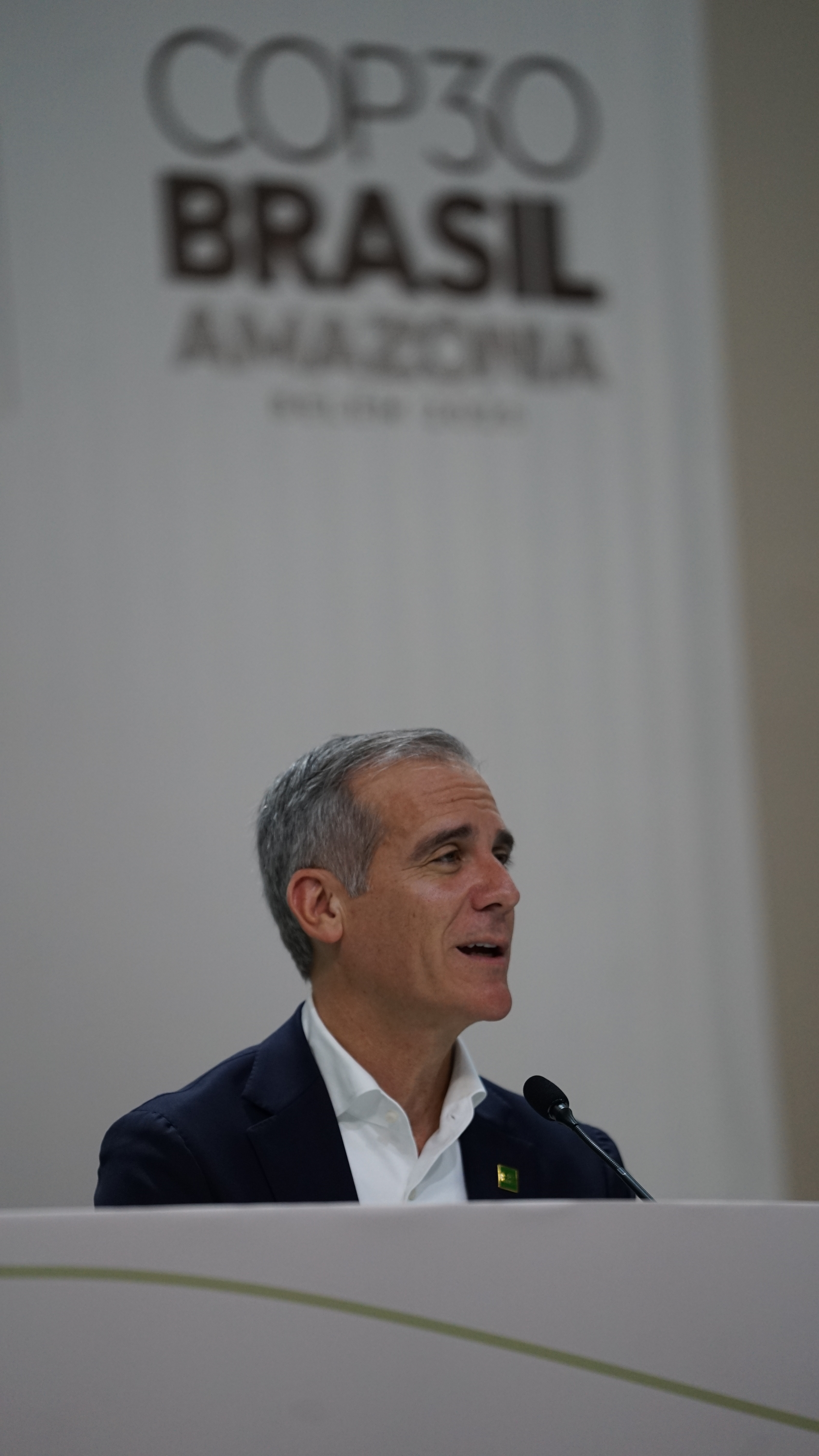
Garcetti at C40 panel at COP30 in Belém (2025)

On his first full day as mayor, Garcetti proclaimed that Los Angeles was beginning to leave behind its culture of car ownership and to focus on "walkability and transit". He encouraged developing plans to make several dozen boulevards more hospitable to pedestrians, cyclists and small businesses.

In April 2014, Garcetti signed into law a new waste franchise agreement, which was planned to expanded recycling to businesses and apartments. He stated his goal was to have 90% of all trash recycled by 2025. That same year, Garcetti co-founded Mayors National Climate Action Agenda, along with Houston mayor Annise Parker and Philadelphia mayor Michael Nutter. The association is composed of 379 United States mayors with the stated goal of reducing greenhouse gas emissions. It is committed to upholding the emissions goals of the Paris Agreement on climate change, and opposed the first Trump administration's decision to withdraw from the pact.

In April 2015, Garcetti released a long-range plan for making the city more economically and environmentally sustainable.

In February 2019, Garcetti signed an ordinance supported by environmental and animal rights activists banning the sale and manufacture of new fur products in Los Angeles. At the time, Los Angeles was the largest city in the United States to ban fur sales. In October 2019, the law was codified by a statewide ban on new fur sales in California.

In April 2019, Garcetti introduced the Los Angeles Green New Deal to address climate change.

From 2019 to 2021, Garcetti chaired the C40 Cities Climate Leadership Group.

==== Urban development and transit ====
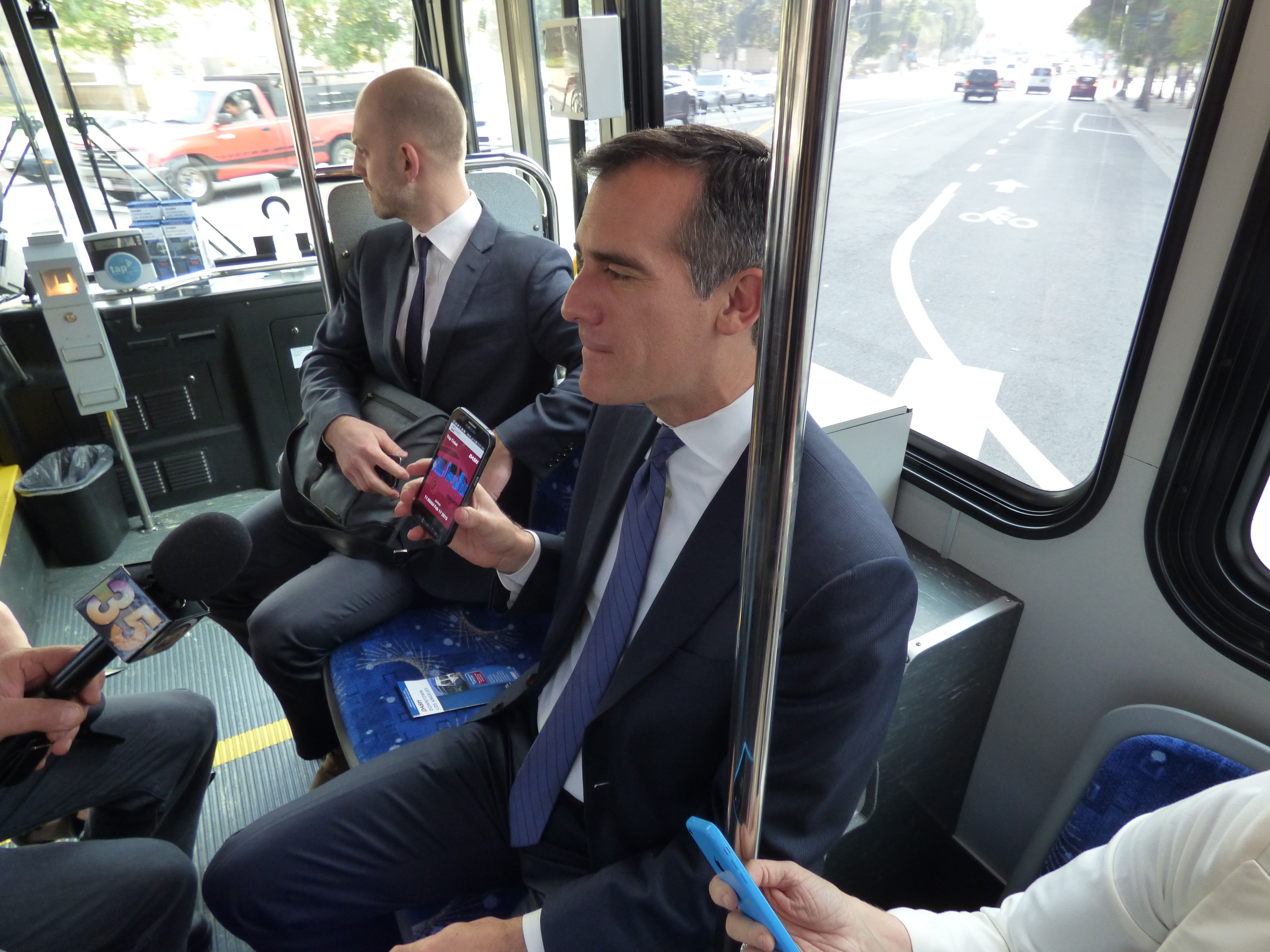
Garcetti announcing LADOT's new mobile app while riding public transportation in 2015

In January 2014, Garcetti announced a new plan to tackle earthquake safety, marking the 20th anniversary of the destructive Northridge earthquake.

In June 2014, Garcetti picked Seleta Reynolds to run the Los Angeles Department of Transportation (LADOT). Later that year, the mayor's office and LADOT released a strategic plan with a Vision Zero goal to eliminate all traffic deaths by the year 2025. Vision Zero is a multi-national road traffic safety project that aims to achieve a highway system with no fatalities or serious injuries involving road traffic.

Garcetti publicly encouraged the Los Angeles River Revitalization Corporation's collaboration with architect Frank Gehry on the River LA project. River LA is a nonprofit organization working to revitalize the Los Angeles River.

In 2016, Garcetti championed Measure M, a half-cent sales tax measure to fund the expansion of the region's Metro rail network. Measure M passed with 70.15% of the vote, clearing the two-thirds majority required.

Garcetti opposed Measure S (originally known as the Neighborhood Integrity Initiative), a NIMBY referendum to block housing development. The referendum would have imposed a two-year moratorium on development projects seeking variances from some aspects of the city's zoning code, made changes to the environmental impact statement requirements in the code, and required the city to update its comprehensive plan during the moratorium. On March 7, 2017, the measure failed with over two-thirds of voters rejecting it.

In 2022, Garcetti opposed California state legislation that would eliminate parking requirements for housing developments near public transit stations.

== National and international politics ==
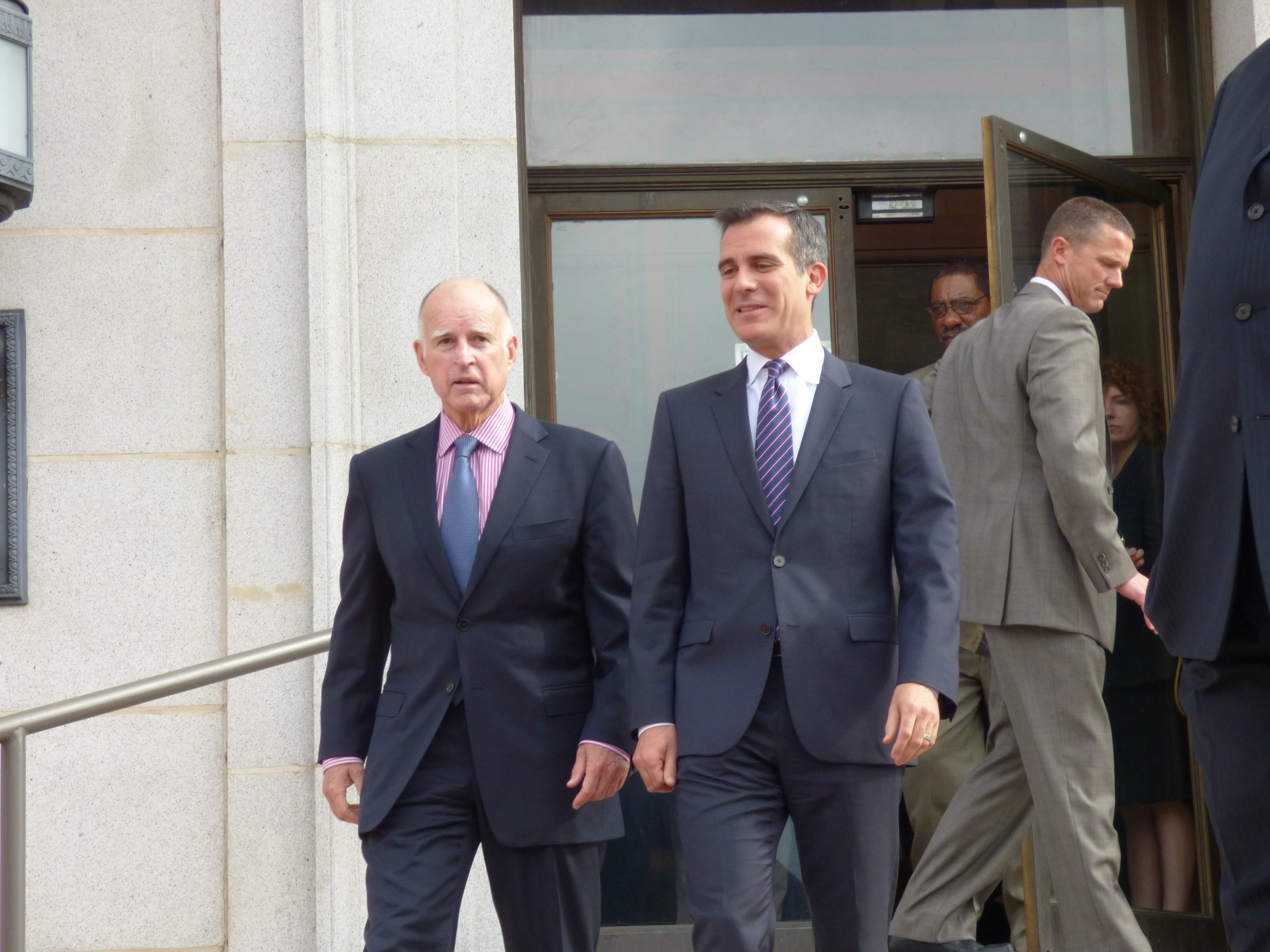
Eric Garcetti with California Governor Jerry Brown.

Garcetti endorsed Barack Obama in early spring 2007 and was the southern California chairman and one of six state co-chairs for the Obama campaign. He traveled to Iowa, Nevada, and six other states, and was a frequent surrogate (in English and Spanish) for the campaign. He served as a superdelegate during the 2008 Democratic National Convention and was elected to serve as the Chair of Democratic Municipal Officials, an organization affiliated with the Democratic National Committee that represents all local elected Democrats in the United States.

Garcetti is a vocal opponent of the Yes California secessionist movement, saying, "I love this country too much to even consider an exit. I want to be a part of an America that continues to stand up for all of us, not bail on all our friends across the country."

As early as 2017, speculation had swirled around Garcetti's potential presidential run in 2020. In 2018, rumors continued about his political ambitions as he made visits to early primary states. In April, he spent two days attending political events across Iowa. In May, he delivered the commencement address at Southern New Hampshire University in Manchester, New Hampshire. Garcetti came under wide scrutiny from Los Angeles residents, including the local chapter of the Democratic Socialists of America, for supposedly focusing on his presidential ambitions over his mayoral duties. However, on January 29, 2019, Garcetti announced he would not run for president in 2020, opting to finish his term as mayor.

On September 22, 2019, Garcetti attended the rally of Armenia's prime minister Nikol Pashinyan at the Grand Park. He stated, "With this prime minister, a new day of sunshine has come to Armenia, a day of democracy, a day of openness, a day of no more corruption, a day where we can say in Los Angeles, it is time for us to pick up to visit, invest, to support, to help the new Armenia rise, and rise, and rise under the leadership of this prime minister." In October 2020, Garcetti expressed support for Armenia in the Nagorno-Karabakh conflict, saying: "I urge our leaders in Washington to conduct the sustained and rigorous diplomacy necessary to bring peace to the Artsakh region. Turkey must disengage."

=== Biden administration ===
On January 9, 2020, Garcetti publicly endorsed Joe Biden for the 2020 Democratic presidential nomination. At the end of April 2020, Garcetti was named a member of the vetting committee for the selection of presumptive Democratic Party presidential nominee Joe Biden's running mate. In November, Garcetti was named a candidate for Secretary of Transportation in the Biden Administration, but faced widespread protests in Los Angeles against the nomination. Garcetti would claim to have turned down a position offered by President-elect Biden, though he refused to be specific on any details.

==== U.S. ambassador to India ====
In May 2021, it was reported that President Biden was considering Garcetti as the Ambassador to India. On July 9, 2021, Biden officially announced his nomination of Garcetti to the post, with his nomination being sent to the Senate a few days later on July 13, 2021. Hearings on his nominations were held before the Senate Foreign Relations Committee on December 14, 2021. His nomination was approved by the Senate Foreign Relations Committee on January 12, 2022.

On March 10, 2022, Senator Chuck Grassley placed a hold on Garcetti's nomination, citing allegations that Garcetti knew about the sexual misconduct committed by his top advisor, Rick Jacobs, and did not take proper action. On March 23, 2022, Senator Joni Ernst announced she would also place a hold on Garcetti's nomination while investigations were conducted as some depositions suggest Garcetti knew of Jacobs' egregious conduct.

On May 22, 2022, CBS News cited reports from U.S. Senate Majority Leader Chuck Schumer acknowledging he did not have enough votes to get Garcetti's nomination passed by the Senate. On January 3, 2023, the Senate returned Garcetti's nomination to the White House as it had expired.

President Biden renominated Garcetti the same day. On February 24, 2023, Senator Marco Rubio placed another hold on Garcetti's nomination due to the sexual misconduct scandal. On March 8, 2023, the Senate Foreign Relations Committee advanced his nomination by a 13–8 vote, with Senators Todd Young and Bill Hagerty supporting his nomination. On March 15, 2023, the United States Senate invoked cloture on his nomination by a 52–42 vote. His nomination was confirmed later that day by a 52–42 vote. Garcetti presented his credentials to Indian President Droupadi Murmu on May 11, 2023.

== Controversies ==
On January 14, 2014, Garcetti was in the passenger seat of an LAPD vehicle which struck a pedestrian. The mayor's office said that the mayor was on his phone, did not see the crash, and had been interviewed by investigators. Battalion Chief Stephen J. Ruda of the LAFD reported the female pedestrian "was stable and alert, responding to our paramedics" before she was rushed to Los Angeles County-USC Medical Center. Hospital spokesperson Rosa Saca said the woman was stable and had been admitted overnight. Garcetti visited the woman in the hospital the next day and stated "We had a nice conversation and I am very pleased that she is in good spirits. I wish her a speedy recovery."

On June 16, 2014, while speaking at the championship celebration for the Los Angeles Kings hockey team, Garcetti cautioned: "There are two rules in politics – never be pictured with a drink in your hand, and never swear." He then held up an empty beer bottle and said, "But this is a big fucking day", prompting a standing ovation from Kings players and the crowd. The incident attracted some controversy. When he appeared on Jimmy Kimmel Live! later that evening, Garcetti told the late night TV host, "It was hockey; it wasn't a match of lawn bowls." The following day, speaking at a luncheon at the Baldwin Hills Crenshaw Plaza, he apologized to those who found his statement offensive and suggested they lighten up. He argued that it was "something that plenty of people have heard in their lives for sure".

On November 5, 2015, Garcetti's office issued a statement endorsing Hillary Clinton in the 2016 presidential election. The situation was quickly acknowledged as an improper use of government resources to distribute a campaign-related proclamation.

In February 2016, local CBS affiliate KCBS-TV reported that in the month before Garcetti's State of the City address, where he praised landscaping company Turf Terminators, the company's employees, friends, and relatives donated $45,000 to his re-election campaign and his nonprofit Mayor's Fund for Los Angeles. Garcetti told KCBS-TV that the donations were legal and the sequence of events was a coincidence.

A 2019 Los Angeles County report on missteps in the government's handling of the 2018 Woolsey Fire cited the unavailability of firefighting units during critical times of the fire, which was the most destructive in county history. During this time, Garcetti personally requested fire officials check the status of a private residence in Bell Canyon. The report states: "a significant number of requests by political figures to check on specific addresses of homes to ensure their protection distracted from Department leadership to accomplish priority objectives."

On August 5, 2020, Garcetti announced that he was authorizing the city to shut off water and power service to houses hosting parties or violating public health orders during COVID-19.

On October 19, 2020, journalist Yashar Ali reported allegations that Garcetti was aware of sexual misconduct committed by his senior advisor Rick Jacobs and did not take proper action.

On October 6, 2021 Garcetti signed legislation to implement what was described as one of the "strictest" vaccine passports in the country. Critics including business trade groups opposed the mandate for forcing employees to put themselves in confrontations with customers. Others, including the ACLU, cited the negative effect of segregating the vaccinated from the non-vaccinated and the potential exacerbation of structural disparities in healthcare. This mandate subsequently extended to all city employees at the time. Hundreds of school district employees and first responders were fired or placed on leave for their refusal to comply with the order.

On January 30, 2022, Garcetti sparked controversy when he posed for a photo with Magic Johnson at the 2022 NFC Championship Game while not wearing a mask, in defiance of city, county, and stadium mask mandates. Garcetti justified the photo by saying he only removed his mask during the photo and held his breath during the photo op. His statement generated widespread ridicule.

== Personal life ==
Garcetti is a photographer, jazz pianist, and composer. He served as a lieutenant in the United States Navy Reserve Information Dominance Corps from 2005 to 2013. On January 4, 2009, he married his longtime girlfriend Amy Elaine Wakeland. A Rhodes Scholar herself, the couple first met while studying at Oxford. They have one daughter, Maya Juanita, who was adopted. Her godfather is actor Evan Arnold, who has been a friend of Garcetti's since junior high school. Garcetti and his wife have also fostered seven children. Before being elected mayor, he and his family lived in Echo Park.

He attends services at IKAR, a post-denominational Jewish congregation founded by Rabbi Sharon Brous and studies Talmud with her twice a week. He has a daily call with her for religious guidance. Garcetti has said, "My parents aren't practicing (Judaism), either of them... we celebrated Passover and Chanukah. I went to Jewish camp. I think I have become more of a practicing Jew or observant later in life. I came to my faith in college." His sister, Dana Garcetti-Boldt, is a former Los Angeles County deputy district attorney; she later became an acupuncturist. She currently works as an advisor to Los Angeles County Supervisor Janice Hahn.

Garcetti has been the recipient of the Green Cross Millennium Award for Local Environmental Leadership in 2003, the New Frontier Award presented by the John F. Kennedy Presidential Library and Museum in 2006, the NAACP "Person of the Year" in 2014, and the honorary Doctor of Humane Letters (L.H.D.) from Whittier College in 2015.

From 2010 to 2012, then City Councilman Garcetti appeared as "Ramon Quintero", the mayor of Los Angeles, on the fictional TNT television show The Closer and its spin-off Major Crimes. His first appearance after becoming mayor was a 2016 episode of Major Crimes. His father, Gil Garcetti, is a consulting producer on both series. Eric Garcetti also made a cameo appearance as a desk security guard working in the mayor's office, in the pilot episode of the TBS series Angie Tribeca.

In 2016, Garcetti briefly appeared in a segment on The Late Late Show with James Corden called "Take a Break", where host James Corden pretended to take over his position for a few hours. At the end of the segment, Garcetti takes back control from Corden having him escorted away by some security officers.

== Electoral history ==
Electoral history of Eric Garcetti
Year	Office		Party	Primary			General			Result	Swing	Ref.
Year	Office		Party	Total	%	P.	Total	%	P.	Result	Swing	Ref.
2001	Los Angeles City Council	13th	Nonpartisan	6,341	24.76%	1st	15,253	51.78%	1st	Won	N/A	
2005	Los Angeles City Council	13th	Nonpartisan	14,697	100.00%	1st	Runoff cancelled			Won	N/A	
2009	Los Angeles City Council	13th	Nonpartisan	7,210	71.91%	1st	Runoff cancelled			Won	N/A	
2013	Mayor of Los Angeles		Nonpartisan	121,930	33.14%	1st	222,300	54.23%	1st	Won	N/A	
2017	Mayor of Los Angeles		Nonpartisan	331,310	81.37%	1st	Runoff cancelled			Won	N/A	

== See also ==
- List of Jewish American politicians
- List of mayors of the 50 largest cities in the United States
- List of Mexican American political figures

Political offices
Preceded by Jackie Goldberg	Member of the Los Angeles City Council from the 13th district 2001–2013	Succeeded by Mitch O'Farrell
Preceded by Alex Padilla	President of the Los Angeles City Council; 2006–2012	Succeeded by Herb Wesson
Preceded by Antonio Villaraigosa	Mayor of Los Angeles; 2013–2022	Succeeded by Karen Bass
Diplomatic posts
Preceded by Kenneth I. Juster	United States Ambassador to India; 2023–2025	Succeeded by Sergio Gor
