= 19.99 (album) =

Studio album by M.O.T.
- Released: 1998
- Genres: Hip hop; Jewish
- Length: 37:57
- Labels: Sire, Warner

19.99 is the 1998 debut album of American Jewish hip-hop duo M.O.T. (Members of the Tribe), which consisted of Hillel Tigay (Dr. Dreidle) and Andrew Rosenthal (Ice Berg). Tigay and Rosenthal conceived the group and album as a legitimate Jewish foray in the steps of groups like the Beastie Boys, but reviewers by and large refused to take the album seriously, instead characterizing it as parody and reviewing it fairly positively as such. 19.99 was a commercial failure; Tigay would later leave the duo, joining Los Angeles congregation IKAR some time after.

== Background ==
Hillel Tigay and Andrew Rosenthal met in the late 1980s, over nine years before releasing their first album as M.O.T., at a meeting for breakfast with a mutual friend. Tigay had recently moved to Los Angeles to begin a music career; Rosenthal was already established as a member of Martini Ranch and as a scorer of electronic music on children's shows. Around seven years after that and two years before their first album, Tigay convinced Rosenthal to form their rap duo. Bringing on Roy Trakin (Meshuggeh Knight) as their manager, the pair signed Sire Records and Warner Records. Tigay told Los Angeles that it "started as a tax write-off, and then it snowballed".

Tigay remarked to The Daily Breeze that the duo frequently draw comparisons to 2 Live Jews; but for him and Rosenthal, the album was not meant to be a parody of hip hop. They compared themselves to the Beastie Boys, another Jewish rap group, except that Tigay and Rosenthal wanted to take that format and apply it to tracks about Judaism.

== Style ==
19.99 combines a Borscht Belt brand of Jewish humor with hip hop music, referred to by the artists as "Hebe-hop". Through the hip-hop, the artists engage in spoofs of black, Italian, and Hispanic masculinity, while simultaneously undermining that spoof with Jewish puns. "Oh God, Get a Job", for example, features one of the artist's mothers on the track repeating the title as an admonishment, as well as a "punked-out" version of traditional Jewish tune "Hava Nagila". Other titles include "Emmes G", which is about non-kosher Chinese food; "So Sue Me", which contains the lines "So sue me! / c'mon do me! / My uncle is a partner at Silverman & Clooney!"; and "Kosher Nostra". Some of the references made in the album are fairly obscure, such as a reference to a line of Manischewitz crackers widely reputed as tasteless.

All tracks are written by Dr. Dreidel and Ice Berg, unless noted.

19.99 track listing
No.	Title	Length
1.	"Messiah Records Theme"	1:08
2.	"Emmes G"	5:51
3.	"Psychosemitic"	3:13
4.	"Town Car"	3:45
5.	"Double Dutch Lunch"	3:38
6.	"So Sue Me"	2:57
7.	"Havana Nagillah"	3:55
8.	"Kosher Nostra"	3:49
9.	"Hebro National Anthem"	1:44
10.	"Oh God, Get a Job"	2:40
11.	"Viva Oy Vegas"	4:17
12.	"19.99"	1:00
Total length:		37:57

== Reception and legacy ==
Reception for 19.99 was mixed – despite the wishes of M.O.T. to create a serious Jewish hip hop album, reviewers largely treated it as a kitschy and satirical but musically lacking album. John Carmen of Variety compared the band to 2 Live Jews, complimenting their brand of humor and quipping that the duo were doing their level best to kill the hip hop genre. Marc Weisblott of The Village Voice characterized the album as dated and "half-witted", even for its time, and referred to the tracks as neither particularly exciting nor "schnorrers". Daniel Balasco of The Jewish Journal of Greater Los Angeles characterized the album as a "proudly derivative" riff on hip hop tropes.

Live performances were well-received; John Carmen wrote that M.O.T.'s performance of the album "jaded Viper Room full of guest-listees to do a hora to their catchiest number, 'Havana Nagilah'". At a concert full of music industry attendees at Canter's Kibitz Room, a local Jewish deli, Corey Levitan of the Daily Breeze wrote that the duo had them "behaving unprofessionally".

An article in The A.V. Club listed 19.99 as one of the "least essential albums of the '90s". (Note: The article alleges that both Tigay and Rosenthal are high-ranking music executives; this is likely false.) In the long run, the album proved to be a commercial failure; Tigay left the duo, later becoming a musical director at IKAR.
