= Monty Roberts =

American horse trainer (1935–2026)

Monty Roberts MVO
- Roberts in 2012
- Born: Marvin Earl Roberts; May 14, 1935; Salinas, California, U.S.
- Died: August 1, 2026 (aged 91); Solvang, California, U.S.
- Occupations: Horse trainer, author
- Writing career
- Subject: Horse training
- Website: www.montyroberts.com

Marvin Earl "Monty" Roberts MVO (May 14, 1935 – August 1, 2026) was an American horse trainer who promoted his techniques of natural horsemanship through his Join-Up International organization, named after the core concept of his training method. He believed that horses use a non-verbal language, which he termed "Equus", and that humans can use this language to communicate with horses. In order to promulgate his methods, Roberts authored a number of books including his original best-seller, The Man Who Listens to Horses, and regularly toured with a live demonstration. He ran an Equestrian Academy in Solvang, California, and an "online university" to promote his ideas until his death on 2026.

== Early life ==
Monty Roberts was born in Salinas, California, and is the son of horse trainer Marvin E. Roberts, who authored his own self-published book, Horse and Horseman Training, in 1957. Roberts claimed that his father beat him as a child, although other family members, including his younger brother Larry, dispute this version of events, with his aunt and cousin, Joyce Renebome and Debra Ristau, specifically refuting the allegation in the book Horse Whispers & Lies.

Roberts competed in rodeo and won his first trophy at the age of four. He attended California Polytechnic State University, San Luis Obispo ("Cal Poly") and riding for their rodeo team, he won two National Intercollegiate Rodeo Association (NIRA) National Championships, including National NIRA Champion Bulldogger in 1957, the NIRA Champion Team Roping in 1956. He graduated from Cal Poly in 1959 with a degree in animal science.

In 1966, Roberts assisted in the founding of Flag Is Up Farms, of which he was the full owner. From 1973 to 1986, he was a leading consignor to the Hollywood Park Two-Year-Old Thoroughbreds in Training Sale. In 2004, Roberts's German-bred horse Sabiango won major races throughout the U.S.

== Career ==
Roberts describes in his books and web site how he was sent to Nevada at the age of 13 in order to round up horses for the Salinas Rodeo Association's Wild Horse Race, and there began observing mustangs interacting with each other. It was there he realized that horses use a discernible, effective and predictable body language to communicate, set boundaries, show fear and express annoyance, relaxation or affection. Roberts stated he came to understand that utilizing this silent language would allow training to commence in a much more effective and humane manner, encouraging true partnership between horses and humans. Roberts describes this language as Equus and he refers to it frequently in his books, tours and demonstrations.

In his books, he has written about how he strongly disagreed with his father's equine training methods, which he described as "almost torturing the animals into submission". However, Marvin Roberts's own book has described training methods similar to the "Join-up" technique developed by son. Moreover, critics have also noted parallels between the training methods of both father and son. In 2000 critics of Roberts registered a website using his name: www.montyroberts.org. After litigation, WIPO ruled against these parties stating they had "engaged in abusive registration" and transferred ownership to Roberts. Roberts said the website owners tried to blackmail him for US$90,000 to transfer the domain name.

Four documentaries on Roberts have been released. The first was the 1997 BBC/PBS documentary Monty Roberts: The Real Horse Whisperer. It showed Roberts as he set out to tame a wild mustang without enclosures, and his developing relationship with the horse later known as Shy Boy. Other documentaries include the 1999 film Shy Boy: The Horse That Came in from the Wild and a 2005 documentary on Roberts's work with wild horses and another about his work with aboriginal youth on Palm Island, Australia. In 2006, a DVD series with 17 episodes, named A Backstage Pass! was completed and broadcast in the UK. The series has also been broadcast in the US on the HRTV cable channel. He had his own show on Horse & Country TV, Backstage Pass with Monty Roberts. In 2023, a documentary about the relationship formed between Roberts and Queen Elizabeth II was released, The Cowboy and the Queen.

== Horse training ==
=== Live demonstrations ===
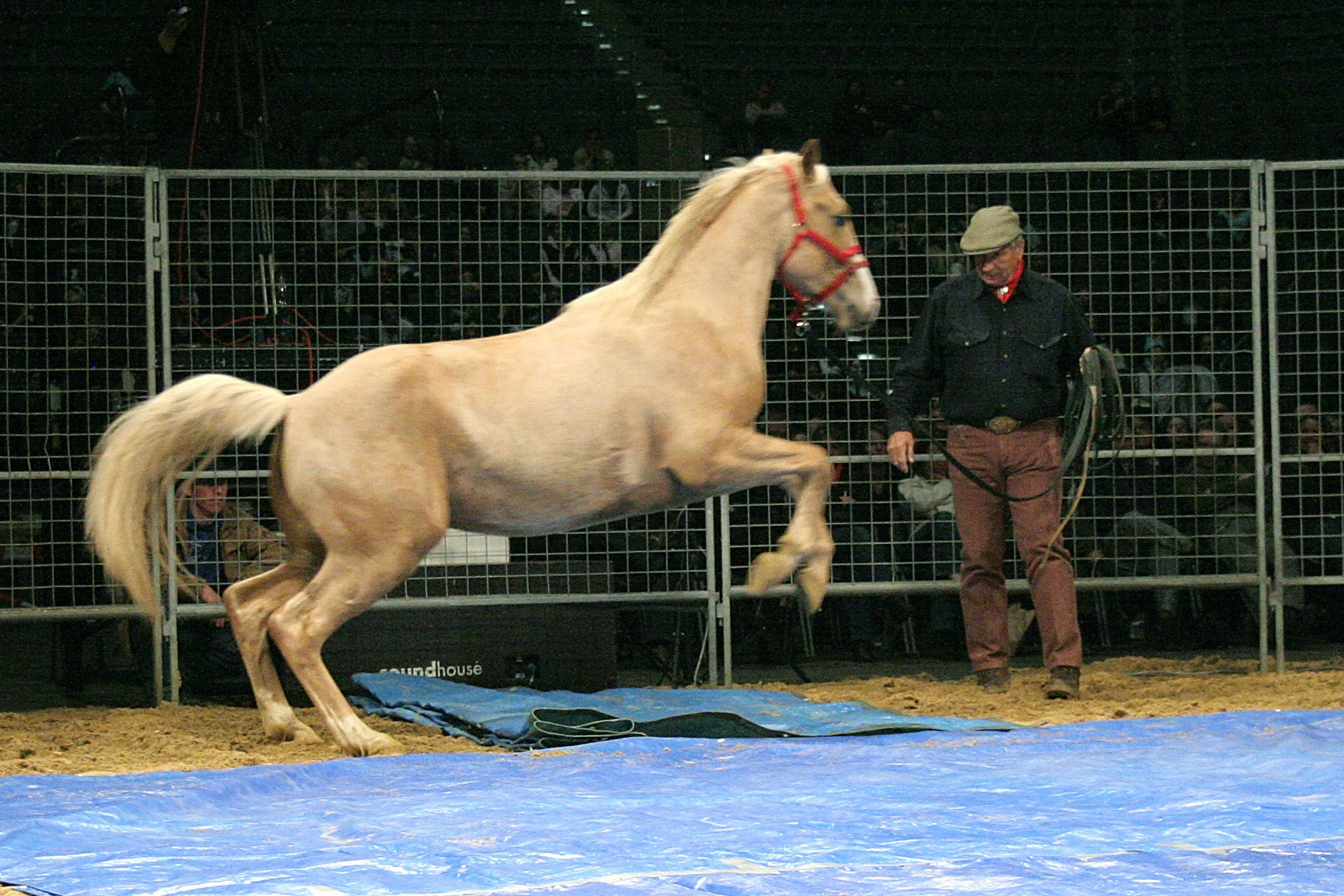
Monty Roberts doing a live demonstration.

Roberts traveled around the world, demonstrating his method of horse training to paying audiences, as well as volunteering time for audiences such as incarcerated youth in juvenile detention facilities. Roberts also taught his techniques to students at his Equestrian Academy in Solvang, California, acted as a consultant at schools with disciplinary issues in the UK and the US, and advised executives at Fortune 500 companies. He also ran the "Equus Online University" to promote his ideas.

=== Royal connections ===
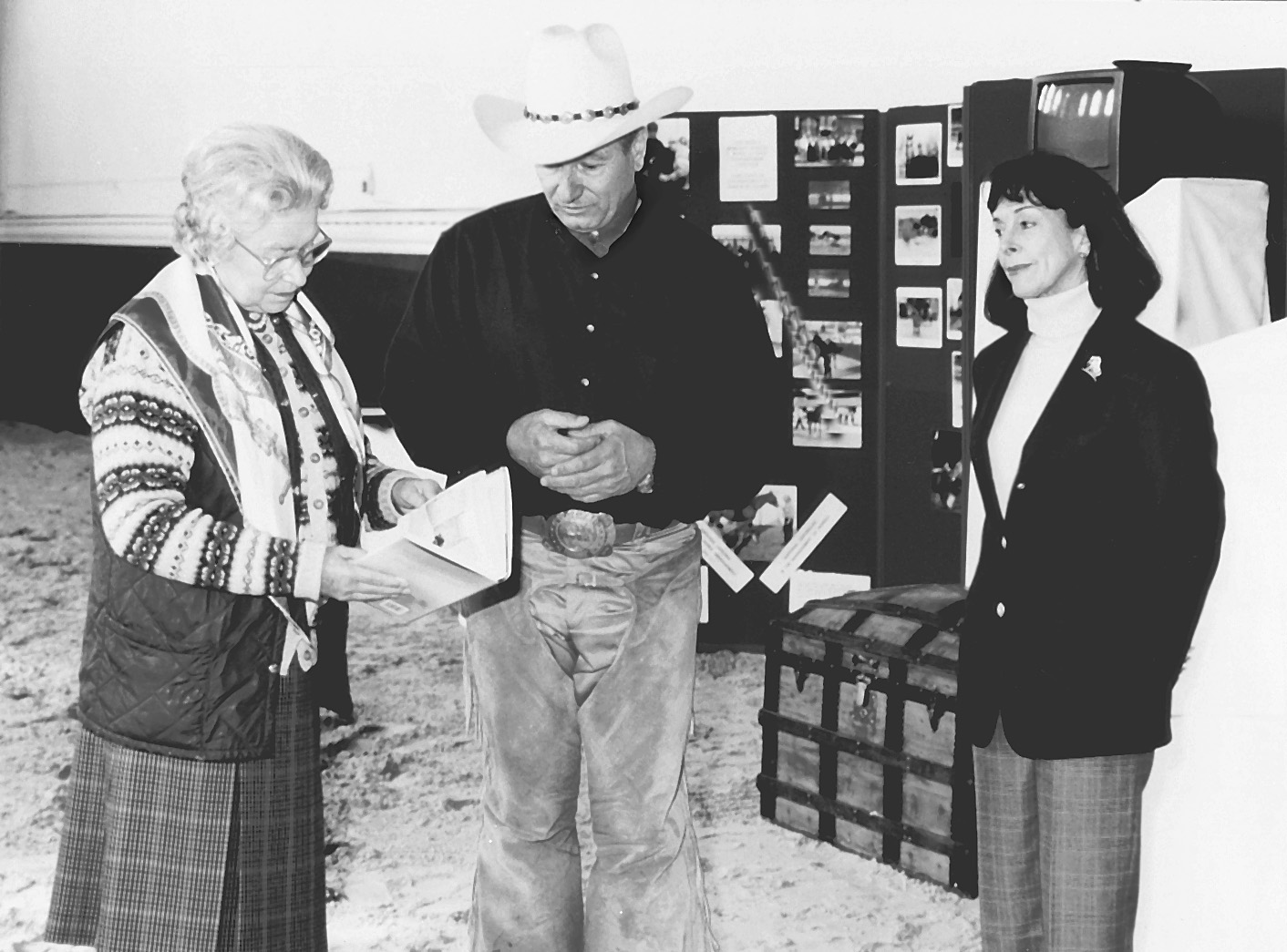
Monty and Pat Roberts present a copy of his book The Man Who Listens to Horses to Queen Elizabeth II in the mews at Windsor Castle in 1996

An event which would change the direction of his life was an invitation in 1989 from the offices of Queen Elizabeth II, who was an avid horsewoman. After hearing about Roberts's training techniques, she invited him to come to the United Kingdom to demonstrate his "Join Up" method to her stable staff. After watching his demonstration, Roberts said the Queen urged him to write a book about his nonviolent methods, which became The Man Who Listens to Horses. During his book tour of the UK in 1996, Roberts presented a copy of his book to the Queen.

In 2002 Roberts returned to Windsor Castle as part of the Queen's Golden Jubilee. In the 2011 Birthday Honours, Roberts was appointed an Honorary Member of the Royal Victorian Order (MVO) "for services to Her Majesty's racing establishment". In June 2012, the Queen, as Patron of Join–Up International, attended the Guards Polo Club, and along with Roberts presented awards to international polo trainers from South and Central America in recognition of their work in promoting the non–violent training of horses.

After the death of the Queen on 8 September 2022, Roberts was invited to her funeral on 19 September.

A 2023 documentary, The Cowboy and the Queen, chronicles the relationship Roberts formed with Queen Elizabeth II. The film is written, produced, and directed by Andrea Blaugrund Nevins. It was her final film before her death in 2025. The film had its world premiere at the Doc NYC festival, opening at New York City's IFC Center on November 16, 2023.

=== Writing ===
Roberts published several books. His first was the autobiographical The Man Who Listens to Horses which was published in 1996, which was on the New York Times Bestsellers list for 58 weeks, and translated into more than 15 languages, selling more than five million copies worldwide. Roberts has written other books, including best-selling Shy Boy: The Horse That Came in from the Wild (1999), Horse Sense for People (2001), From My Hands to Yours (2002), The Horses in My Life (2005) and Ask Monty (2007).

== Death ==
Roberts died from complications of an autoimmune disease at his Flag Is Up Farms in Solvang, California, on August 1, 2026. He was 91.

== Awards ==
In 2002, Roberts received an honorary doctorate in animal psychology from the University of Zurich, Switzerland and in 2005 he gained an honorary doctorate in animal psychology from the University of Parma, Italy. In 2004, the Girl Scouts of the USA commissioned a special Join-Up badge and training program in honor of Roberts's work, and in 2005 he became the first foreign-born recipient of the German Silbernes Pferd (Silver Horse) Award for outstanding contributions to promoting the love of horses. In December 2008, readers of the British equestrian magazine Your Horse named Monty Roberts Personality of the Year 2008.

== See also ==
- Horse Whispers and Lies (1999 biography)
- 'People who Train People: An interview with Monty Roberts.' (1997) The Teacher Trainer. Vol. 11 No. 3 pp 14–15 Pilgrims: Canterbury.
- The Cowboy and the Queen
