= Andrea Blaugrund Nevins =

American screenwriter (1962–2025)

- Born: March 15, 1962; New York City, New York, U.S.
- Died: April 12, 2025 (aged 63); Los Angeles, California, U.S.
- Other names: Andrea Blaugrund; Andrea Nevins
- Occupations: Screenwriter; film director; film producer
- Spouse: David Nevins (m. 1996)

Andrea Blaugrund Nevins (March 15, 1962 – April 12, 2025) was an American writer, director, and producer based in Los Angeles.

== Early life and education ==
Nevins was born in New York City, on March 15, 1962, where she attended the Chapin School. Her father is Stanley Blaugrund, the former Director of Otolaryngology and Head and Neck Surgery at Lenox Hill Hospital in New York. Her mother, Annette Blaugrund, was Senior Curator of Paintings, Sculpture and Drawings at the New-York Historical Society, and guest curator at the Parrish Art Museum in Southampton, New York. Nevins credited the work of Barbara Kopple and Errol Morris as early inspirations.

Nevins graduated from Harvard University, where she took visual arts classes and majored in social studies. Her thesis was titled The Renaissance of a Housing Project: D Street and Its People.

== Career ==
After graduation, she gained experience as a sports reporter in North Carolina and was a staff writer for The Gainesville Sun from 1986 until October 1988. One of her newspaper articles featured noted environmental activist Kiki Carter. Nevins and two other staff writers, Mitch Stacy and Lisa Trei, won first place in the Excellence in Medical Journalism Awards for a six-part series titled "Too Poor to be Sick." She worked at National Public Radio's All Things Considered in Washington, D.C., and for Peter Jennings' documentary series, Peter Jennings: Reporting, where she won an Emmy for her work on gun control. She married David Nevins in 1996, who later became an executive with Showtime and CCO of CBS.

Nevins worked on a 1994 documentary for A&E on Hillary Clinton titled Hillary Rodham Clinton: Changing the Rules and a 1995 documentary on Jesse Jackson titled I Am Somebody. In 1998, she was nominated for an Oscar in the category of Documentary (Short Subject) for her first independent film Still Kicking: The Fabulous Palm Springs Follies. She shared credit with director Mel Damski, who directed episodes of the hit television shows M*A*S*H and Barnaby Jones.

== Documentaries ==
In 2008, Nevins directed and produced the feature documentary The Other F Word. The choices Nevins made as director surprised critics with "ironic twists" that showed how former punk rockers "balance their anarchic personalities with 21st century parenting." Oscilloscope Laboratories and Showtime purchased The Other F Word. Oscilloscope's Adam Yauch had reservations about the premise of the documentary before seeing it, but said he was glad he "didn't go with my first instinct" and called it a "beautiful and touching film."
Nevins' additional directorial projects were:

- Hysterical, a 2021 FX Original, premiering at SXSW.
- Tiny Shoulders: Rethinking Barbie, a Hulu Original, premiered at the Tribeca Film Festival and Hot Docs in 2018.
- State of Play: Happiness, aired on HBO in 2014
- Play it Forward, chosen to premiere at the Opening Gala of the 2015 Tribeca / ESPN Sports Film Festival
- The Cowboy and the Queen (2023), about the relationship between horse trainer Monty Roberts and Elizabeth II.

== Personal life and death ==
In 1996, she married David Nevins in Shelter Island Heights, New York. They had three children and lived in Los Angeles. She was a founding member of IKAR, a post-denominational Jewish congregation which was named one of the 50 most influential Jewish non-profits. Nevins volunteered with UNICEF USA and sat on the regional board of directors for Southern California. She was also the founder, along with Los Angeles’ First Lady, Amy Elaine Wakeland, and several other women, of The XX Fund, a donor advised fund to help under served women and girls in Los Angeles.

Nevins died of breast cancer at home in Los Angeles, on April 12, 2025, at the age of 63.
