= 1999 (disambiguation) =

1999 was the last year of the 1990s as well as the penultimate year of the 20th century and the 2nd millennium.

1999 may also refer to:

== Film, TV and entertainment ==
- 1999 (film), a 2009 Canadian crime drama film
- Space: 1999, a 1975–1977 British television series
- 1999: Hore, Mita koto ka! Seikimatsu, a Famicom game released only in Japan
- In 1999, a 1912 vaudeville sketch
- Archer: 1999, the tenth season of the animated television series, Archer

== Music ==
=== Albums ===
- 1999 (Prince album), 1982
- 1999 (Cassius album), 1999
- Ratt (album), album by Ratt often referred to as "1999"
- 1999 (mixtape), by Joey Badass, 2012
- 1999: The New Master, a 1999 EP
- 1999, a 2020 EP by Rich Brian

=== Songs ===
- "1999" (Prince song), 1982
- "1999" (Charli XCX and Troye Sivan song), 2018
- "1999", a song by Danny Brown from Stardust, 2025
- "1998" (instrumental), a track by Binary Finary also known by its remix/reissue name "1999"

== Other ==
- NGC 1999, a dust filled bright nebula

== See also ==
- 19.99
