= Standing Together =

Standing Together may refer to:

- Standing Together (George Benson album), 1998
- Standing Together (Midnight Star album), 1981
- Standing Together (movement), Israeli Arab-Jewish movement

== See also ==
- Stand Together (disambiguation)
