= Los Angeles Green New Deal =

Municipal program

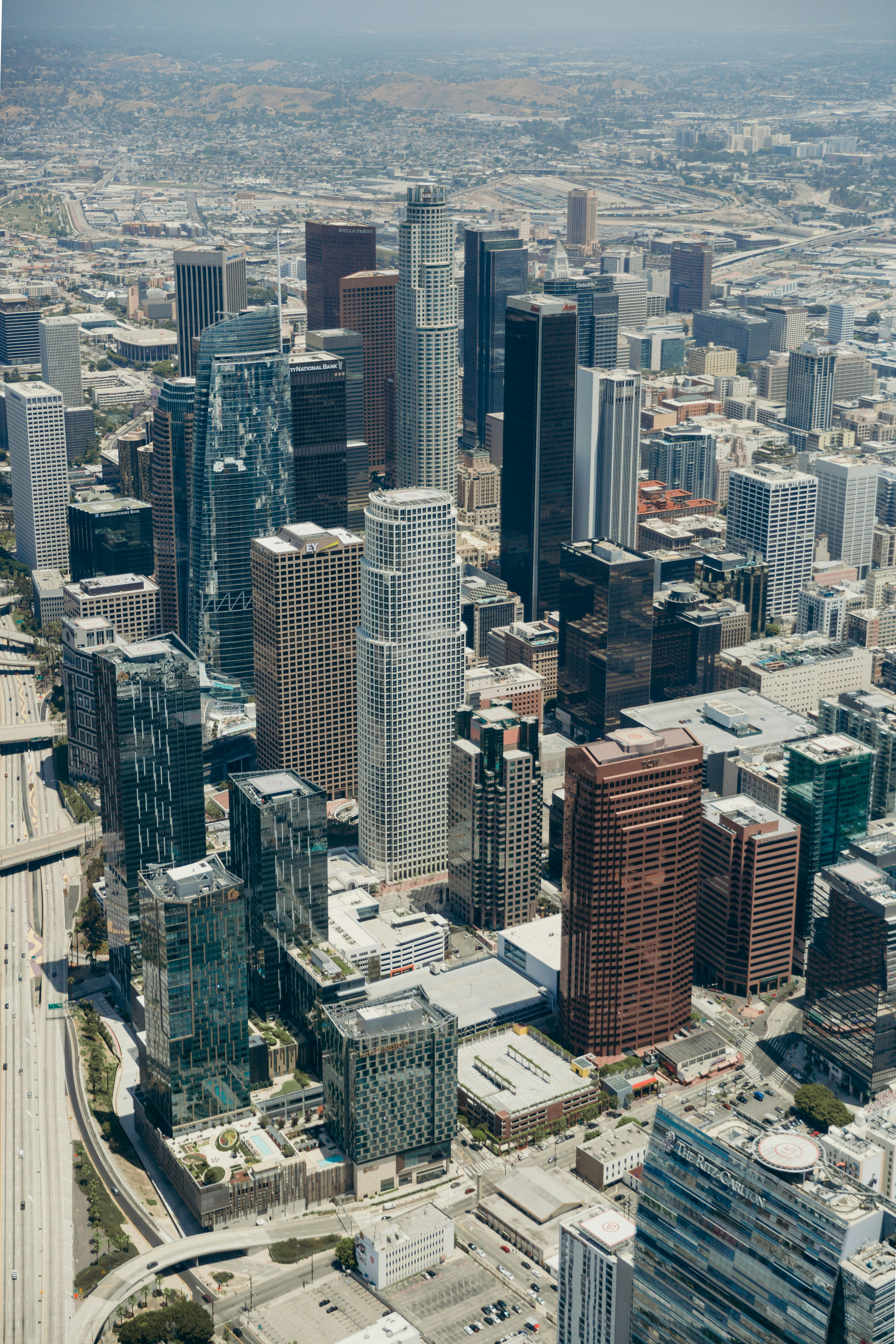
- Los Angeles skyline in 2020
- Abbreviation: LA Green New Deal
- Formation: 2019
- Founder: Eric Garcetti
- Type: Municipal program
- Legal status: Active
- Purpose: Environmental sustainability, green jobs creation, emissions reduction, climate change mitigation
- Headquarters: Los Angeles, California
- Region served: Los Angeles
- Parent organization: City of Los Angeles

The Los Angeles Green New Deal, or LA Green New Deal, is the municipal Green New Deal of Los Angeles, California. Announced in 2019 by Mayor Eric Garcetti, the Los Angeles Green New Deal aims to create green jobs, slash emissions, invest in public transportation, and mitigate climate change. Garcetti introduced the plan with the three Es: the environment, the economy, and equity.

== Overview ==
The program includes 13 distinct topic areas: environmental justice, renewable energy, local water, clean and healthy buildings, housing and development, mobility and public transit, zero-emission vehicles, industrial emissions and air quality monitoring, waste and resource recovery, food systems, urban ecosystems and resilience, prosperity and green jobs, and leading by example. Specific goals within the topic area framework include reaching a 100% carbon-free grid by 2035, 100% zero-emission vehicles in the city by 2050, and 100% wastewater recycling by 2035.

The city established plans to hire a forest officer to oversee the planting of 90,000 trees. Green job creation is a core part of the plan.

The mayor is pushing an ambitious environmental agenda, while the union represents workers concerned about job security and the economic impact of these policies.

== History ==
The plan was opposed by many workers in the Los Angeles Department of Water and Power (LADWP), including those in the International Brotherhood of Electrical Workers. They criticized its plan to phase out several gas-fired power plants, which would cause job losses. Workers protested in front of Garcetti's house and the LADWP building.

In 2023, City Controller Kenneth Mejia released a report that criticized the Green New Deal's implementation, claiming that many of its targets were vague and the plan had "outlived its usefulness".

== Results ==
While proponents point to 11% reduced emissions in the first year and thousands of green jobs created as evidence of the program's success, others highlight that the outcomes are difficult to measure, and the plan is lagging behind certain targets.
