= David Nevins (television producer) =

American TV executive and executive producer

- Born: February 28, 1966 (age 60); Washington, D.C.
- Education: B.A. Amherst College
- Occupations: Television executive and executive producer
- Known for: Chief Content Officer of Scripted Originals for Paramount+ and Chairman and CEO of Showtime Networks
- Spouse: Andrea Blaugrund Nevins (m. 1996; died 2025)
- Children: 3

David Nevins (born February 28, 1966) is an American television executive and executive producer. He is CEO of Peter Chernin’s North Road Company. Previously, he was the Chief Content Officer of Scripted Originals for Paramount+, and Chairman and CEO of Showtime Networks, both owned by Paramount Global. He is also a member of the Peabody Awards board of directors, which is presented by the University of Georgia's Henry W. Grady College of Journalism and Mass Communication.

== Early life ==
Nevins was born in 1966, the son of Suzy and Louis H. Nevins. His mother is a travel agent and his father served as president of the Western League of Savings Institutions. He graduated with a Bachelor of Arts from Amherst College in Amherst, Massachusetts.

== Career ==
Nevins most recently served as Chief Content Officer of Scripted Originals for Paramount+ and Chairman and CEO of Showtime Networks Inc. He was responsible for development and deployment of scripted originals, including both dramas and comedies, for Paramount+, and for overseeing all aspects of Showtime Networks and its channels, along with BET Networks, under the Premium Network Group segment of Paramount Media Networks. He exited Paramount Global in late 2022.

Nevins joined Showtime as entertainment president in 2010. Under his watch, Showtime greenlit shows such as Homeland, Billions, Ray Donovan, House of Lies, SMILF, The Chi, and the Twin Peaks revival. In 2018, Nevins was promoted to Chief Creative Officer, CBS, where he oversaw programming, marketing and research across CBS Television Studios, the CBS Television Network's Entertainment division, Showtime Networks and, in conjunction with CBS Interactive, programming for CBS All Access.

As the head of Imagine TV between 2002 and 2010, Nevins produced shows such as Arrested Development, Friday Night Lights, and 24. He was also executive vice president of programming at Fox, and senior VP of primetime series at NBC during the height of “Must See TV,” developing shows such as Homicide and ER.

In 2016, Nevins was honored with the Dorothy and Sherrill C. Corwin Human Relations Award from the American Jewish Committee Los Angeles.

In 2023, Nevins joined Peter Chernin’s North Road Company as CEO. In this role he oversees companies such as Chernin Entertainment, Red Arrow Studios, and several others.

== Personal life ==
In 1996, Nevins married Andrea Blaugrund in Shelter Island Heights, New York. He previously served on the board of directors of the post-denominational Jewish congregation IKAR.

In 2018, Nevins received the top award for excellence, which is named for Frank Stanton, at the annual luncheon benefiting the Center for Communications.
