= Horse Whispers and Lies =

1999 biography of Monty Roberts by Renebome and Ristau

- Author: Joyce Renebome, Debra Ristau
- Language: English
- Subject: Monty Roberts
- Genre: Biography
- Publisher: Veracity Books
- Publication date: 1999
- ISBN: 1-929055-44-7

Horse Whispers & Lies is a 1999 biography of Monty Roberts by Joyce Renebome and journalist Debra Ristau. It was published in paperback by Veracity Books in 1999 (ISBN 1-929055-44-7).

Renebome, Monty Roberts's aunt, and Ristau, his cousin, set out to present another view of Monty Roberts's parents, Marvin and Marguerite Roberts. In his bestselling autobiography, The Man Who Listens to Horses, Monty Roberts had claimed his father had abused both him and the horses he trained. In response, Renebome and Ristau present material they say shows that Marvin Roberts was actually a kind, humane man from whom Monty learned many of his most effective horse training techniques.
