= Sharon Brous =

American rabbi (born 1973)

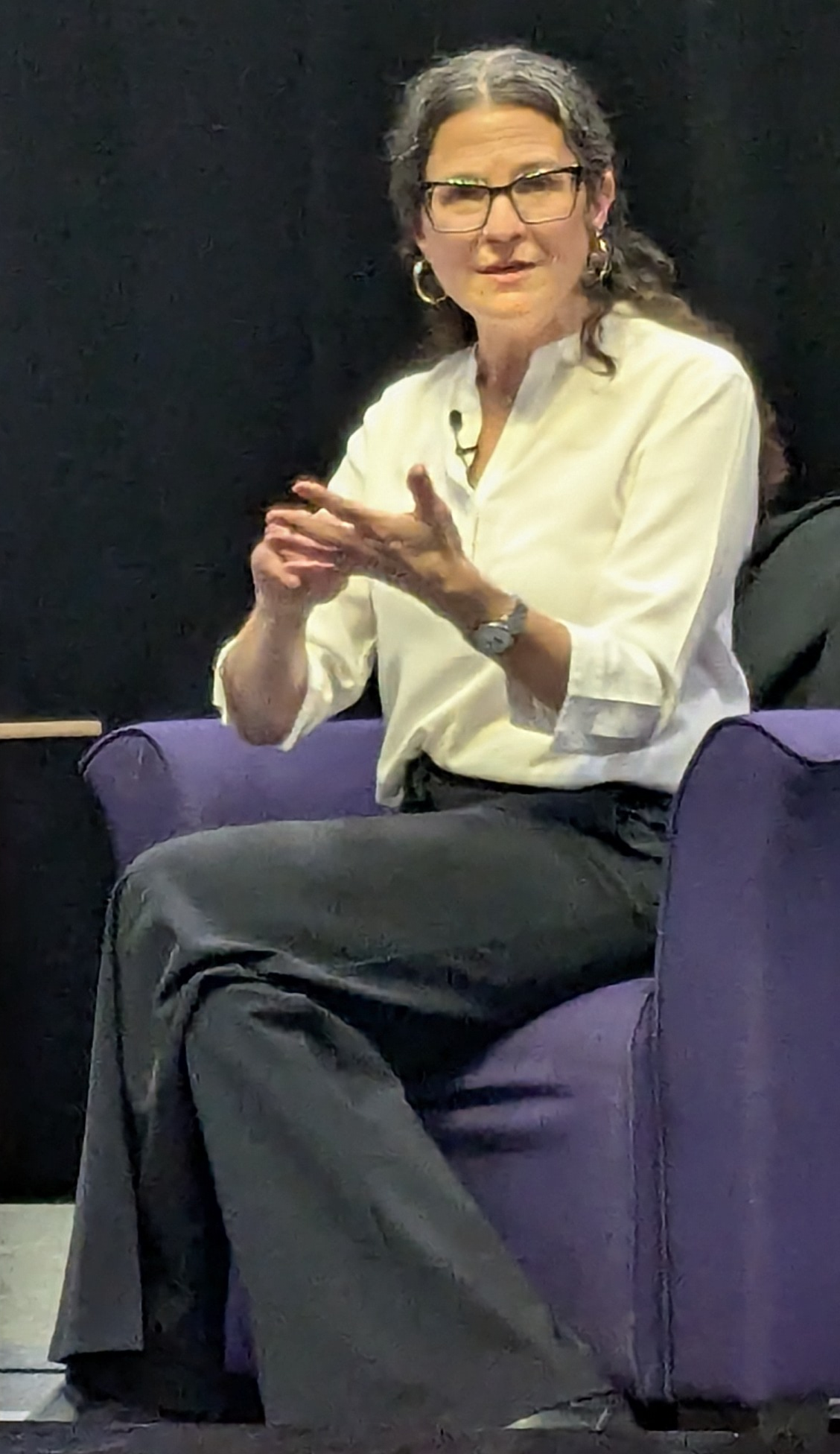
- Sharon Brous speaking at the University of St. Thomas in 2025.
- Born: November 30, 1973 (age 52)
- Education: Columbia University (BA)
- Occupation: Rabbi
- Employer: IKAR
- Spouse: David Light
- Children: 3
- Website: ikar.org/team/rabbi-sharon-brous/

Sharon Brous (born November 30, 1973) is an American rabbi who is the senior rabbi of IKAR, a Jewish congregation in Los Angeles.

== Biography ==
Brous was raised in Essex County, New Jersey. Her family attended a Reform synagogue, but her parents considered themselves Reconstructionists and were married by the movement's founder, Mordecai Kaplan. She attended Columbia University, partially due to its large Jewish population, and was struck by the diversity of the Jewish community. While living in New York City, she attended a number of different synagogues, often accompanied by her friend David Light, whom she would later marry. She received her bachelor's degree in 1995.

Brous decided to study in Jerusalem, enrolling at Hebrew University. It was during this time that Brous decided to pursue the rabbinate.

Brous was ordained by the Jewish Theological Seminary in 2001 and received a master's degree in human rights from Columbia University. She served as a Rabbinic Fellow at Congregation B’nai Jeshurun in New York City, and helped to lead the congregation in the aftermath of the September 11 attacks.

After finishing her fellowship, Brous and her husband moved to Los Angeles so he could pursue work in Hollywood. In 2004, Brous was a founder of IKAR, serving as the congregation's spiritual leader.

In January 2016, Brous and colleagues from six other Jewish communities from across the United States officially announced the launch of the Jewish Emergent Network, a collaboration between IKAR and Kavana in Seattle, The Kitchen in San Francisco, Mishkan in Chicago, Sixth & I in Washington, D.C., and Lab/Shul and Romemu in New York City. All seven communities have individually received recognition for the impact of their work in the Jewish community on both a local and national scale.

Brous is known for her strong political stances, and has asserted that "There’s no such thing as decoupling religion and politics." She studied Talmud with LA Mayor Eric Garcetti twice a week, and Mayor Garcetti stated that he was in touch with her daily. Brous also hosted Mayor Garcetti at her Jewish High Holidays events for multiple years running.

The 2022 art exhibit “Holy Sparks”, shown among other places at the Dr. Bernard Heller Museum, featured art about twenty-four female rabbis who were firsts in some way; Penny Wolin created the artwork about Brous that was in that exhibit.

She sits on the faculty of the Hartman Institute-North America, Wexner Foundation's Wexner Heritage; and REBOOT, and is a Senior Fellow at Auburn Theological Seminary. She serves on the International Council of the New Israel Fund and rabbinic advisory council to American Jewish World Service.

== Personal life ==
Brous married a college friend, David Light, shortly after the two graduated. The couple have three children.

== Writing ==
In January 2024, she released her first book, The Amen Effect: Ancient Wisdom to Heal Our Hearts and Mend Our Broken World.

=== As a contributor ===
- Sharon Brous and Jill Hammer (2000). "Proclaiming Liberty throughout the Land". In Goldstein, Elyse (ed.). The Women's Torah Commentary: New Insights from Women Rabbis on the 54 Weekly Torah Portions. Woodstock, Vermont: Jewish Lights Publishing. pp. 238–45. ISBN 1-58023-076-8.
- Ruth Andrew Ellenson, ed. (2005). The Modern Jewish Girl's Guide to Guilt. Penguin. ISBN 9780452287488.
- Jeffrey K. Salkin, ed. (2007). A Dream of Zion: American Jews reflect on why Israel matters to them. Jewish Lights Publishing. ISBN 9781580234153.

== Recognition ==
In 2006, The Forward cited her as among the 50 most influential American Jews.

In 2013, The Daily Beast listed Brous as #1 on its list of America's most influential rabbis; she ranked #5 on the same list in 2012. The publication wrote that "Ikar, the come-as-you-are spiritual community that Brous, 39, founded nearly a decade ago, has become a magnet for L.A.’s young, unaffiliated Jews" in a time when many synagogues face "disaffected, declining membership."

In 2013, she blessed President Barack Obama and Vice President Joe Biden at the Inaugural National Prayer Service, and blessed LA Mayor Eric Garcetti at his inauguration in 2017.

In 2018 Brous, among others, was on the cover of Time; the cover was based on a 1943 Norman Rockwell painting titled "Freedom of Worship".

In 2021, Brous received the Human Rights Award from Death Penalty Focus. Karen Bass presented the award.
