= IKAR =

Jewish congregation founded in Los Angeles

- Location in western Los Angeles, California

Religion
- Affiliation: Judaism
- Rite: Non-denominational Judaism
- Ecclesiastical or organisational status: Congregation
- Leadership: Rabbi Sharon Brous; Rabbi Morris Panitz (Associate); Rabbi Hannah Jensen (Assistant); Rabbi Deborah Silver (Associate)
- Status: Active

Location
- Location: Shalhevet High School, 910 South Fairfax Avenue, Los Angeles, California 90036
- Country: United States
- Coordinates: 34°03′35″N 118°21′46″W

Architecture
- Founder: Melissa Balaban; Rabbi Sharon Brous
- Established: 2004 (as a congregation)
- Completed: 2015

Website
- ikar.org

IKAR is a non-denominational Jewish congregation and community founded in Los Angeles, California, in the United States. The congregation was founded in 2004 and is led by rabbi Sharon Brous, who was one of its founders.

== History ==
IKAR (transliterated from Hebrew as "essence"), was founded in 2004 by CEO Melissa Balaban, senior rabbi Sharon Brous, and others in a Santa Monica home.

In September 2015, IKAR announced that it had signed a two-year lease to relocate to the newly built campus of Shalhevet High School. In August 2018, the synagogue announced that it paid $6.9 million ($8.8 million in 2025 dollars) for a building on South La Cienega Boulevard near 18th Street, although the move was not immediate due to time needed for construction. As of January 2024, IKAR still met at Shalhevet.

== Activities ==
IKAR schedules its services to avoid conflict with Shalhevet's school days, meeting in the gymnasium on Shabbat and other holidays where Shalhevet is not in session.

== Notable members ==
- Mayim Bialik, actress
- Eric Garcetti, former mayor of Los Angeles
- Rick Jaffe, screenwriter
- David Nevins, president of entertainment for Showtime Networks
- Andrea Blaugrund Nevins
- Dara Resnik, screenwriter, producer, and director
- Amanda Silver, screenwriter
- Daniel Sokatch, CEO of the New Israel Fund
- Steven Spielberg, film director and producer
