= Jewish Emergent Network =

Network of Jewish congregations in the United States

- Formation: January 2016; 10 years ago
- Type: Network of independent Jewish congregations
- Purpose: Religion
- Location: United States
- Members: Seven (7) (2024)
- Director: Justin Rosen Smolen
- Website: jewishemergentnetwork.org

The Jewish Emergent Network is a network of seven independent Jewish congregations in the United States. Founded in January 2016, the network shares a "devotion to revitalizing the field of Jewish engagement, a commitment to approaches both traditionally rooted and creative, and a demonstrated success in attracting unaffiliated and disengaged Jews to a rich and meaningful Jewish practice."

The various members of the Network have a wide range of religious perspectives, but share a commitment to reaching populations that are not addressed by traditional American synagogues and fighting "demographic free fall." The Network currently includes IKAR in Los Angeles, Kavana in Seattle, The Kitchen in San Francisco, Mishkan in Chicago, Sixth & I in Washington, D.C., and Lab/Shul and Romemu in New York.

== Background and critical response ==
The organization takes its name, "Jewish emergent," from a series of articles by Shawn Landres, who developed the term by studying three types of non-traditional Jewish communities: lay-led independent minyanim, "start-up" congregations that were still led by clergy, and "parashuls" (a Jewish spiritual community where religious worship activity is not the primary religious activity). Most of its member congregations describe themselves as re-inventing traditional aspects of Judaism to be relevant to the needs of their participants in the 21st century. Some commentators, however, have noted that, despite this, the Network and similar independent Jewish communities have begun to re-institute many of the features more commonly found in traditional American Jewish communities, such as membership and acquiring permanent spaces for worship and community services. Others, such as historian of American Judaism Jonathan Sarna, argue that the Network's approach is in line with American traditions of reinventing Judaism, such as American Reform congregations or the independent havurah movement in the 1970s.

== Current Activities ==
The organization holds an annual conference entitled "(Re)VISION Conference." From 2016-2020, it funded a fellowship for a total of 14 junior rabbis to be placed in multi-year fellowships at each of its member institutions.

During the early phase of the COVID-19 pandemic, the Network engaged in several approaches to online Jewish holiday observance, including an all-night Torah study program for Shavuot and an online program for repentance and reflection during the month of Elul.
