= DC Minyan =

Jewish congregation in Washington D.C

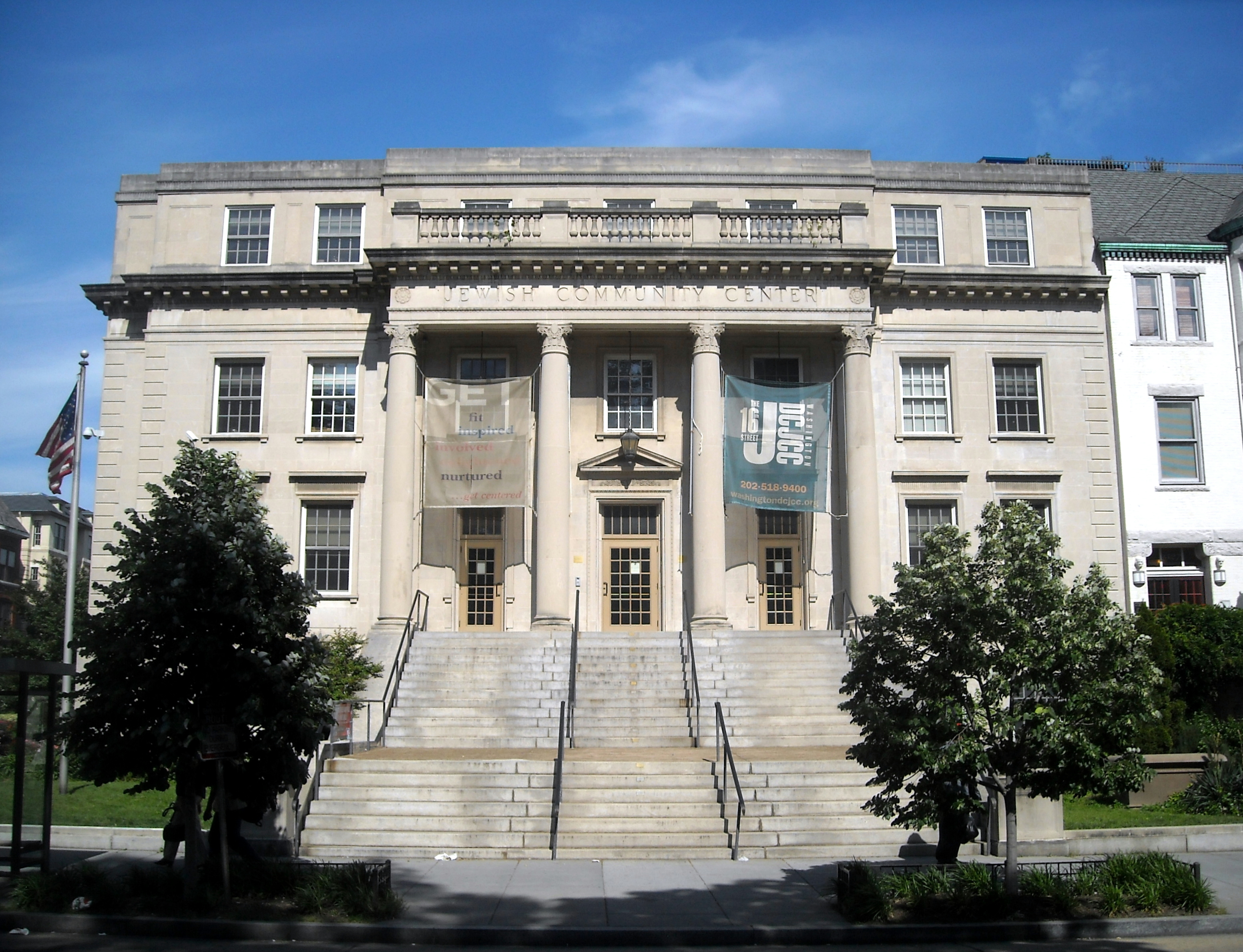
- The Washington, D.C. Jewish Community Center, where the congregation holds the majority of its worship services and other events.

- Location in central Washington, D.C.

Religion
- Affiliation: Judaism
- Rite: Unaffiliated
- Ecclesiastical or organisational status: Synagogue; Independent minyan
- Leadership: Lay-led
- Status: Active

Location
- Location: Washington, D.C. Jewish Community Center, 1529 16th Street NW, Dupont Circle, Washington, D.C. 20036
- Country: United States
- Coordinates: 38°54′39″N 77°2′10″W

Architecture
- Established: 2002 (as a congregation)

Website
- dcminyan.org

The DC Minyan is a lay-led unaffiliated Jewish congregation that holds worship services and other events in the Washington, D.C. Jewish Community Center (DCJCC), located in the Dupont Circle area of Washington, D.C., in the United States.

Founded in 2002, the congregation generally demonstrates the characteristics of an independent minyan, with a dual commitment to halacha/Jewish law and egalitarianism. Its programs include Shabbat/Sabbath and Holy Day worship services, education, social events, retreats, and opportunities for tikkun olam, improving and transforming the world.

The leaders and members of the community seek to create "a warm and intellectually engaging community for prayer and study." Additionally, Beth Tritter, one of the group's four co-founders, stated that the minyan has been able to create worship services that exhibit "ruach [spirit] and kavanah [spiritual focus]." The DC Minyan is part of a growing number of similar lay-led programs within the national and international Jewish community, such as New York's Kehilat Hadar and Jerusalem's Shira Hadasha and Kehilat Kedem, that are sometimes described as being part of the independent minyan movement.

The name, minyan (Hebrew: מנין), means the prayer quorum traditionally required for a full Jewish prayer service.

== History ==
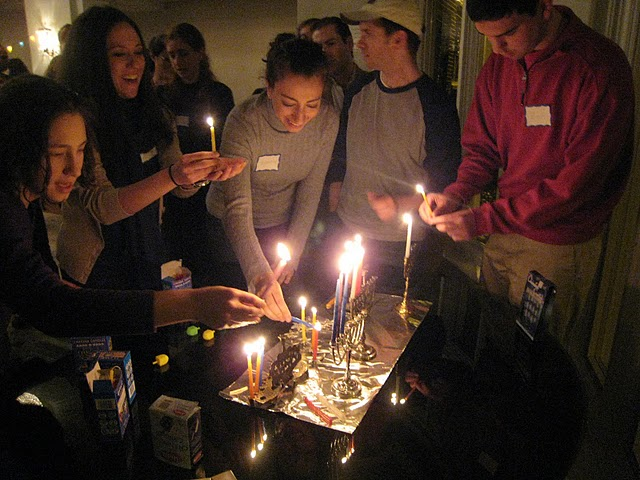
Members of the DC Minyan light candles in celebration of Hanukkah.

The DC Minyan first began meeting in February 2002, at Luna Books, a bookstore in Dupont Circle. Its founders were a mixture of young Conservative and Modern Orthodox Jews, who wanted to re-set worship that combined traditional prayers and rituals with an egalitarian approach to the inclusion of women. (Note: The four founders were "raised" within Orthodox, Conservative, and Reform; movements and at the time of their meeting, two were attending Conservative synagogues, and two were attending Orthodox synagogues.)

As the congregation grew, in late Spring 2002 it moved to the Washington D.C. Jewish Community Center. For special occasions, such as worship services for the High Holy Days, when space requirements or scheduling needs make it impossible to use the Center, the congregation used a number of other nearby buildings, including the Westin Embassy Row Hotel.

== Worship, education, and community life ==
DC Minyan programs include guided individual study; study group including the DC Beit Midrash (co-sponsored by the DCJCC); celebrations of life-cycle events; and volunteer opportunities, often linked to programs at the DCJCC. The congregation's website offers audio files for individual prayers and prayer services, to help individuals learn "synagogue skills" that include leading the service or a portion of it, and reading from the weekly Torah portion and haftarah (the weekly portion from the Prophets).

Hospitality is also stressed as a foundational concept for community, and programs offered in this area include initiatives that coordinate invitations for Sabbath or holy day meals between those seeking a place and those with a place at their table to offer.

However, the goal of creating and offering vibrant worship services that combine tradition and egalitarianism remains at the core of the minyan's offerings. As of 2010, Saturday morning worship services are held on the first and third Saturday of each month, and Friday night Sabbath evening services are held on the second and fourth Fridays of each month, in the DCJCC. Other locations are used when required, almost always in the Northwest section of Washington, D.C.

== Balancing egalitarianism and tradition ==
The founders of the DC Minyan were committed to a traditional approach to worship and Jewish life, and determined to push the limits of tradition to include women to the greatest extent possible. They began by studying ancient Jewish legal texts, with the goal of learning the position of traditional authorities, "with an eye towards including women in the services . . . even allowing them to take a leadership role."

The congregation's commitment to both traditionalism and egalitarianism has resulted in a number of innovative policies and practices that sometimes reflect approaches of other groups, and sometimes are a hybrid of past approaches. So, for example, the worship setting includes separate seating for men and women (with a space in between the sections, rather than using a more traditional mechitza, or physical wall), but calling up women as well as men to lead worship and read from the Torah.

While precedent was found for prayer without a mechitzah, and even for calling women up to the Torah, no traditional source seemed to allow conducting certain portions of the worship service without a minyan—a prayer quorum—of ten adult men, a situation that seemed to ignore and show a certain amount of disrespect for the women who had come to pray. The compromise agreed upon at the early DC Minyan services was that the portions of the service that did require such a minyan would not be conducted unless there were both ten men and ten women. According to some sources, this approach, sometimes referred to as the "10-and-10 minyan," was originally crafted by the minyan, Shira Hadasha, in Jerusalem, inspiring a number of other groups around the world to follow the same example. (Note: The Jewish Orthodox Feminist Alliance uses the term, Partnership minyan, for lay-led worship groups that consider themselves to be part of Modern Orthodox Judaism, while trying to increase the role of women in services through practices like the 10-and-10-minyan.) In 2018, after extensive halakhic study, DC Minyan decided to adopt a policy of simply counting any ten Jewish adults, regardless of gender, as a minyan.

In addition to efforts to respect and accommodate egalitarianism, there are also obvious signs of pluralism in terms of the various movements within Judaism. For example, many of the worshipers use Orthodox prayer books, and others follow in prayer books created by the Conservative movement. Similarly, participants follow the Torah reading with various printed editions of chumashim, with commentaries on the readings from the Torah and haftarah (Prophetic readings) that sometimes offer divergent translations and interpretations of the text, depending upon the movement that published the book.

== Independent minyanim ==
The DC Minyan is part of a growing number of similar independent minyanim groups. There were other attempts to create settings for worship outside of the traditional structure, such as the chavurah movement. However, Professor Jack Wertheimer, an academic from the Jewish Theological Seminary of America, stated in 2010 that independent minyanim represented a different phenomenon:

...members of today's independent minyanim are not counter-cultural types in rebellion against their parents or committed to smashing existing institutions, but a generation that is at once self-sufficient and open to compromise. An example of the newer spirit is the DC Minyan's commitment to separate seating, an infringement on the principle of strict sexual egalitarianism that is maintained for the sake of accommodating the group's diverse population. In the present moment, pluralism is valued over purity.

Rabbi Elie Kaunfer, rosh yeshiva and executive director of Mechon Hadar and on the Talmud faculty of Yeshivat Hadar, defined, in 2009, an "independent minyan"—Jewish worshiping communities like the DC Minyan—as a congregation meeting three requirements:

1. volunteer-led and organized with no paid clergy;
2. no denomination/movement affiliation; and
3. founded in the previous ten years.

Kaunfer added the goal of "spiritual prayer" to this list, noting that he often experienced worship services more as a "community experience" than as a "spiritual one." Kaunfer noted that Kehilat Hadar began in New York as a result of a number of young Jews who were "looking for new ways to connect to the substance of their religion and tradition"—but instead of becoming "just a local minyan," ... "it became a model of grassroots religious community that spread dramatically across the United States and Israel." That model of community came to be known as an "independent minyan."

Kaunfer emphasized that the word "independent" meant that many of these groups developed independently in terms of volunteers coming together to create and lead it, but—in agreement with Wertheimer's assessment of these minyanim—they are not, nor do they seek to be, independent of the larger Jewish community in terms of their vision or self-identity. "Quite the contrary," he stated, "they see themselves filling a need not being met by existing institutions, but operating within the larger Jewish map, not outside or against it."

== Leadership and guidance ==
Ongoing leadership for the DC Minyan is provided by the members of the Steering Committee and the Leadership Council, with frequent input from all participants, and proactive efforts to receive input and ideas from the outside community. The DC Minyan website described "The DC Minyan Dialogue" as "an effort initiated by DC Minyan's leadership to take the pulse of the community by soliciting ideas and feedback on DC Minyan's programming, leadership structure, and decision-making processes." Additionally, a "kashrut task force" was convened to "study Jewish source texts on kashrut, research the policies of other communities, consider relevant teshuvot (halakhic responsa) relating to communal kashrut standards, and solicit feedback from community members about the current policy."

The Leadership Council include special volunteers for administration, the Beit Midrash, Chinuch, community relations, finance, gabbai, hospitality, parents and kids, social action, and special events. In addition, there are special voluntary positions that include representatives or coordinators for the "Dvar Tefillah and Torah", the Friday Night Oneg collation, "greening"/ecological issues, happy hours, Shabbat morning "kiddush", life cycle events, technical/website support, and a liaison for LGBTQ issues.

Although there is no rabbi officially affiliated with the congregation, one rabbi who is consulted on a regular basis is rabbi Ethan Tucker, the co-founder, rosh yeshiva, and Legal Chair of Hadar, in New York. Rabbis in the D.C. area also offer assistance on an needs basis, including support for life-cycle events and pastoral care.
