= Edlavitch Jewish Community Center of Washington, D.C. =

Jewish community center in Washington, D.C., U.S.

Edlavitch Jewish Community Center of Washington, DC

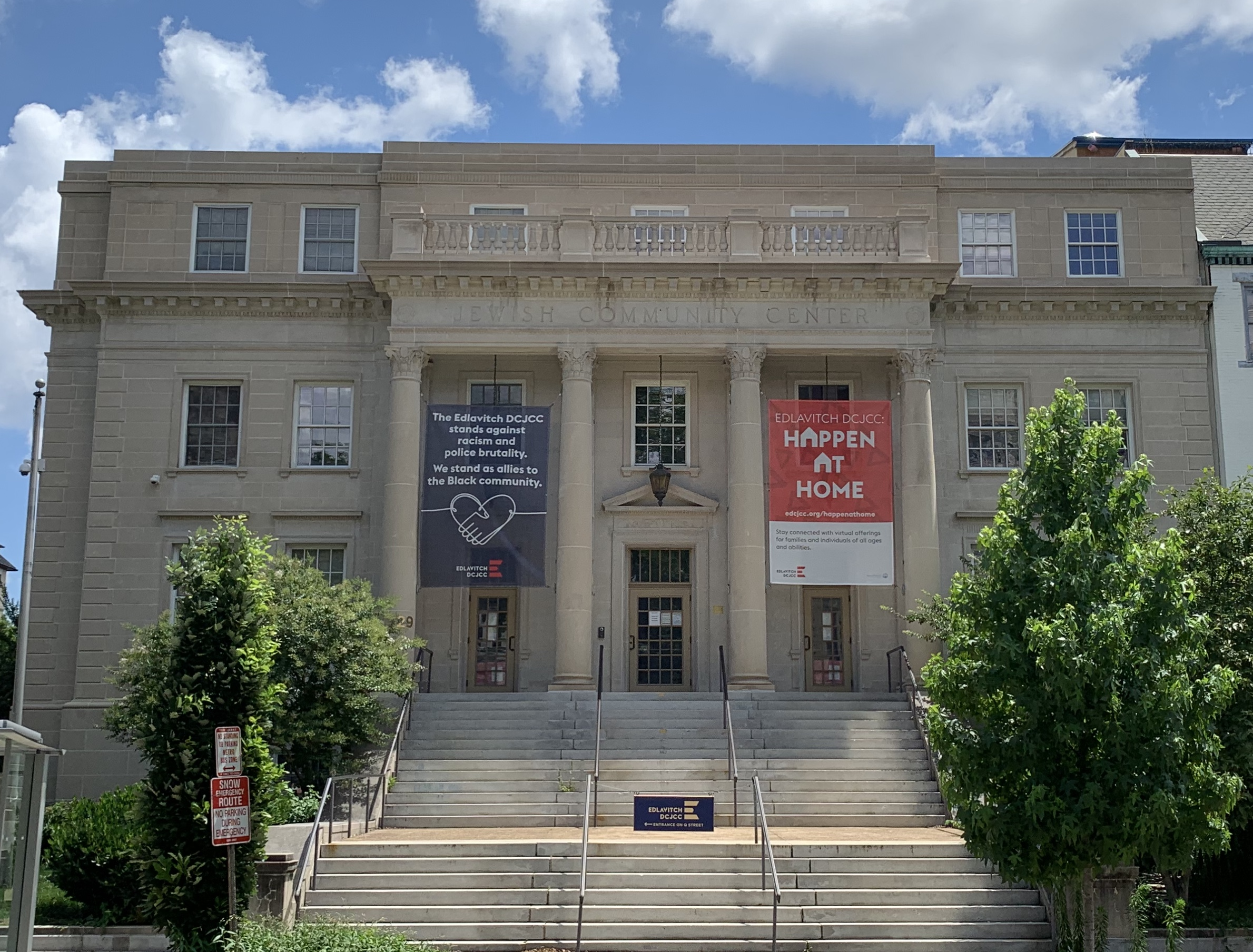
- Edlavitch Jewish Community Center of Washington, D.C. in 2020

- Location within Washington, D.C.
- Abbreviation: Edlavitch DCJCC
- Established: May 3, 1925 (original ground-breaking); February 22, 1926 (official opening); After closing in 1968, reopened January 12, 1997.
- Tax ID no.: 52-1398151
- Legal status: 501(c)(3) nonprofit organization
- Purpose: To promote the welfare of our members through programs that reflect Jewish heritage and values.
- Location(s): 1529 16th Street NW, Washington, D.C. 20036-2249
- Coordinates: 38.910833°N 77.036111°W
- Services: Provides and promotes educational, physical, cultural, recreational, civic, and related activities, and reflect Jewish heritage and values.
- Chief Executive Officer: Jennifer Zwilling
- President: Daniel O. Hirsch
- Revenue: $7,305,944 (2013)
- Expenses: $8,029,014 (2013)
- Endowment: $2,913,684
- Employees: 215 (2012)
- Volunteers: 9,156 (2012)
- Website: edcjcc.org

The Edlavitch Jewish Community Center of Washington, D.C. (formerly the Washington DCJCC) is an American Jewish Community Center located in the historic district of Dupont Circle. It serves the Washington, D.C. area through religious, cultural, educational, social, and sport center programs open to the public, although many programs are strongly linked to Jewish culture, both in the United States and in Israel. It is part of the JCC Association (JCCA), the umbrella organization for the Jewish Community Center movement, which includes more than 350 JCCs, YM-YWHAs, and camp sites in the U.S. and Canada, in addition to 180 local JCCs in the Former Soviet Union, 70 in Latin America, 50 in Europe, and close to 500 smaller centers in Israel.

Among the many notable programs sponsored by the EDCJCC are Theater J, a theater group that has hosted world premieres of plays by noted Jewish playwrights such as Wendy Wasserstein, Richard Greenberg, and Ariel Dorfman; the Washington Jewish Music Festival; the Jewish Literary Festival; and the Washington Jewish Film Festival, that includes screenings both at the Center itself, and at other Washington, DC, institutions, including a number of foreign embassies representing nations that produced the films.

The EDCJCC also houses the Hyman S. and Freda Bernstein Library, which includes a Jewish Heritage Video Collection, a children's reading collection, and a collection of genealogy books and materials. It is a constituent organization of the Jewish Community Relations Council of Greater Washington, serving Washington, D.C., Maryland, and Virginia.

== History ==
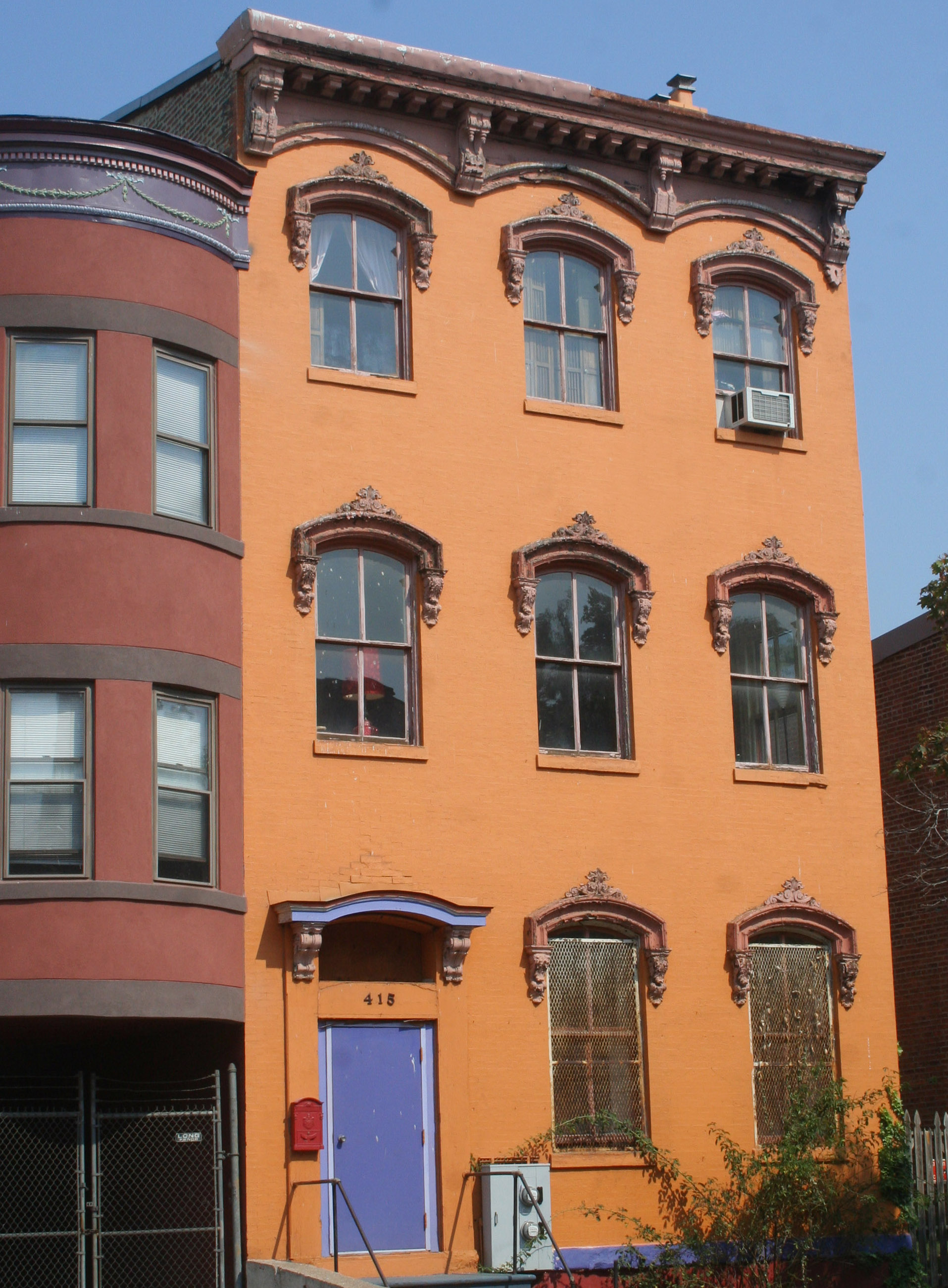
415 M Street, NW, the original home of the YMHA (1913–1914), precursor to the DCJCC. From 1914 to 1923, the building would house the Hebrew Home for the Aged.

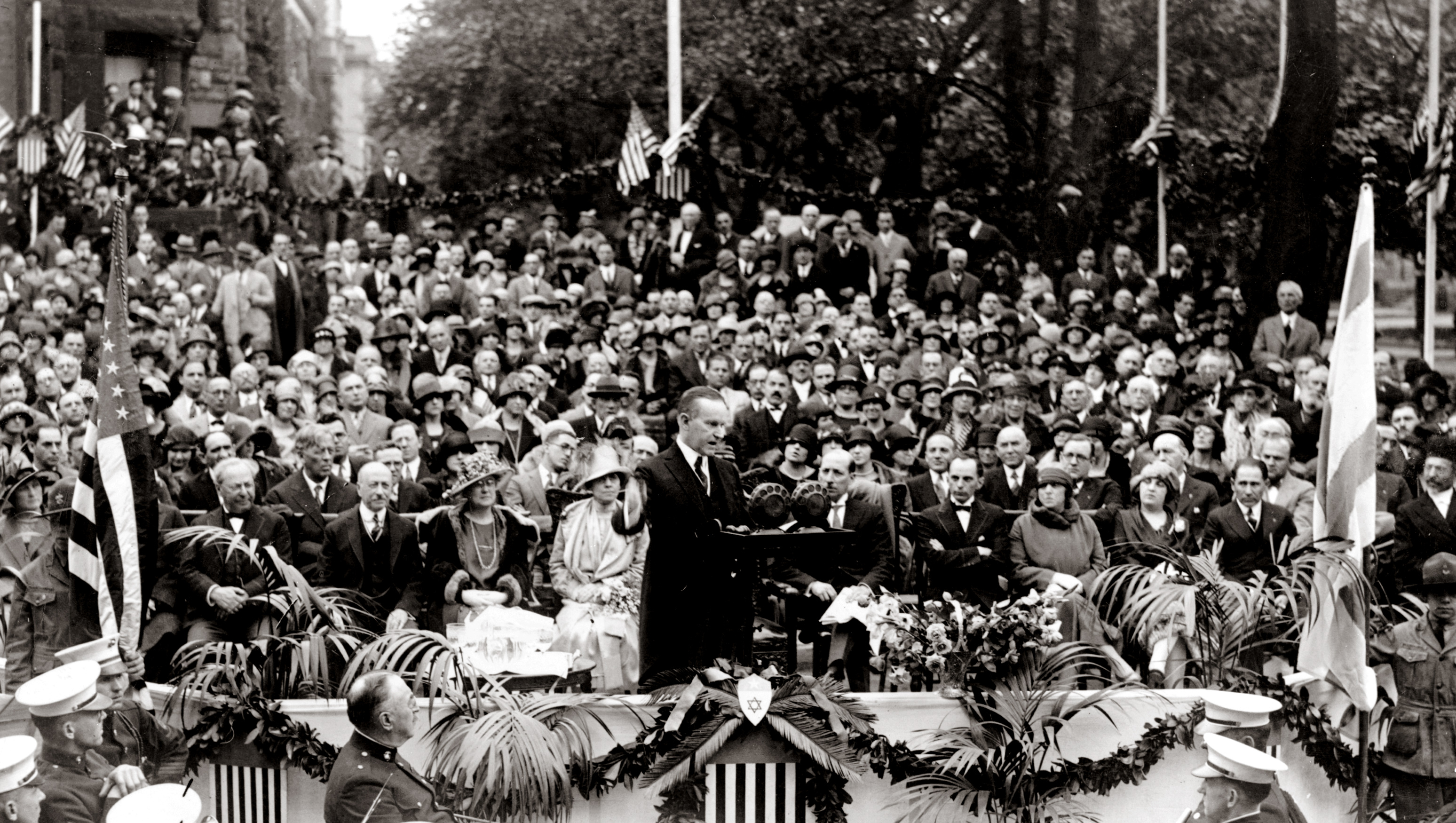
U.S. President Calvin Coolidge delivers a speech during the DCJCC cornerstone ceremony, May 3, 1925.

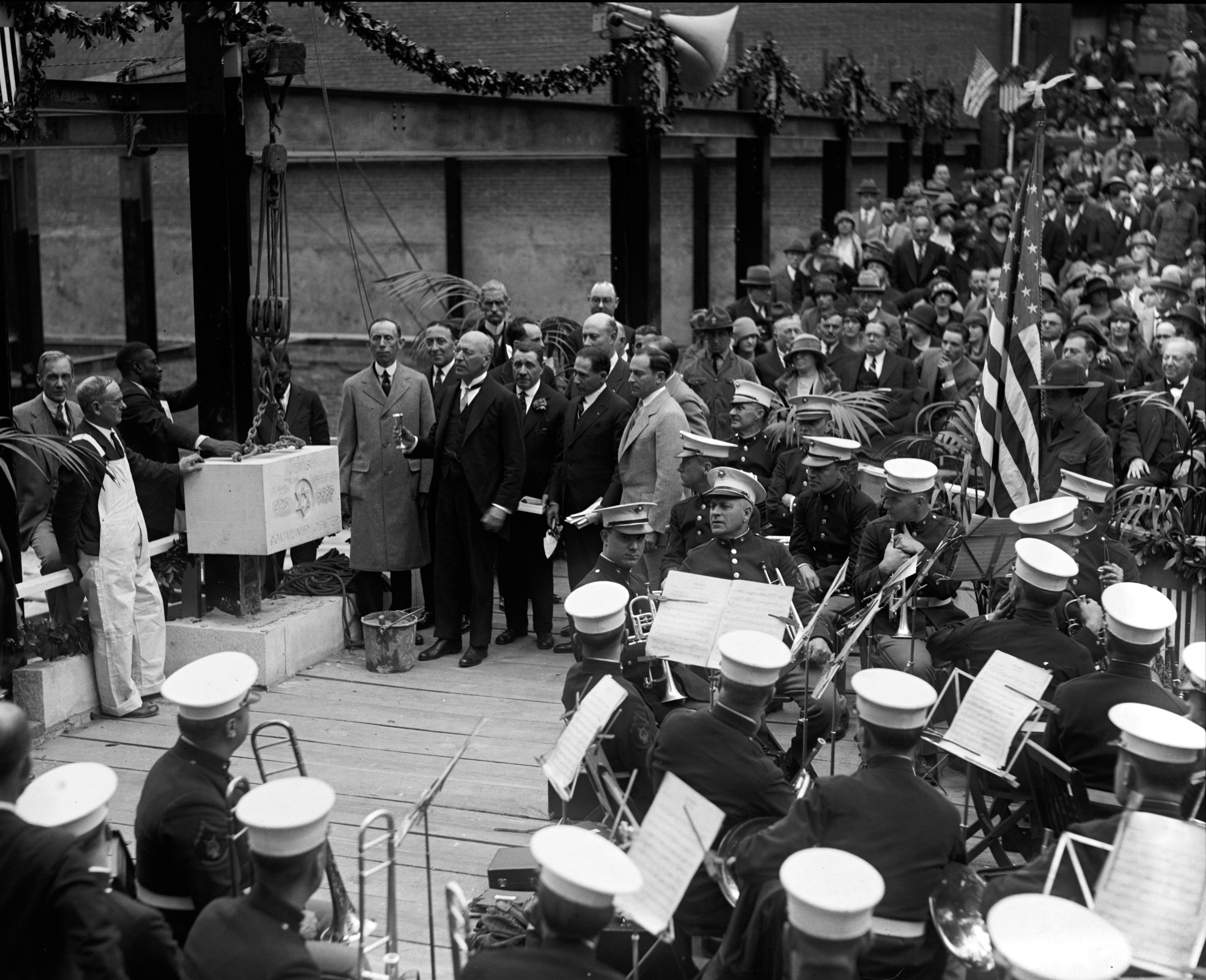
Cornerstone ceremony, May 3, 1925

Although the first recorded Jew settled in Washington, DC, in 1795, the first large immigration of Jews to the nation's capital took place with the arrival of a number of German Jews, in the 1840s. In 1852, twenty-one Washingtonian Jews established the Washington Hebrew Congregation, and in 1863, after an Act of Congress that certified the Jewish community's right to own property, they purchased a church at 8th and H Streets, NW, and after renovations, opened it as the city's first synagogue. East European immigrants arriving in the early 1900s raised the Jewish community population to approximately 4000. In 1911, a group of young Jewish men in their early twenties formed the Young Men's Hebrew Association(YMHA) in 1911, followed by the establishment of the Young Women's Hebrew Association the community established the Young Men's Hebrew Association (YMHA), in 1913. The YMHA, which moved from 415 M St, NW, to 11th and Pennsylvania Ave, NW, in 1918, which would serve as the first center to support the cultural, recreational, and some spiritual needs of the Jewish population.

Later, with the outbreak of World War I, the influx of military and government officials included many Jews, and "the need for a larger community center in the capital city was evident." After a five-year campaign to raise money, on May 3, 1925, following the war, the ground-breaking ceremony was held for the Jewish Community Center at its present location, at 16th and Q, NW. President Calvin Coolidge spoke at the laying of the cornerstone that day, addressing the topic of "The Spiritual Unification of America", referring to the Hebrew scriptures as a uniting force among the widely scattered diverse communities in America. He said that "This edifice ... is a fine example for other communities. It speaks a purpose to uphold an ancient and noble philosophy and to assure that such philosophy shall always be adapted to the requirements of changing times." The official opening would be held in 1926, on Washington's Birthday, February 22. The Center would soon become the meeting place for six formal Jewish organizations, including Bnai Brith, Hadassah, and the American Jewish Committee, as well as the place where informal groups, "just about every Jewish youth club in the city", and individuals from all levels of Washington Jewish society would meet. Abe Pollin, now known for his role in the world of Washington, D.C., sports, recalls that the JCC "was where all the camaraderie took place", including the time in the steam room, or the games of squash, handball, and table tennis in the men-only health club. Roof dances were held in the summer, with dancing moved inside the rest of the year, and Adas Israel Synagogue held classes in the building until it moved to Woodley Park in 1955. Among the many activities was even an annual "Queen Esther Beauty Contest", with pictures of the finalists featured in the pages of The Washington Post.

In 1939, thanks to a gift from Washington Post owners Eugene and Agnes Meyer, a new wing was added to the center, to house a library and an expanded health club. The new facility included a squash court, and three handball courts—and a massage room that was staffed by Seventh-day Adventists, who observe Saturday as the Sabbath, similar to Jewish practice.

Special events were held for military veterans, and no veteran was charged to participate in any center activity during or immediately after World War II. In 1942, a USO lounge was dedicated, open to both Jewish and non-Jewish veterans. Additionally, the Center hosted numerous programs in support of the U.S. war effort, including the 1943–44 "Program for Victory" that promoted the purchase of war bonds and war stamps.

As many Jews in the city moved to the suburbs, the DCJCC closed and a new JCC was established in Rockville, Maryland, opening on May 8, 1969. It still exists as a thriving JCC, known as the "JCC of Greater Washington", and is located on a "campus" that now also houses the Hebrew Home of Greater Washington, the Jewish Social Service Agency (JSSA), The Jewish Federation of Greater Washington, and a number of Jewish senior citizen residences. There is also a Jewish Community Center between Annandale and Fairfax, Virginia.

The JCC building was sold to the city, which turned it over to Federal City College, the forerunner of the University of the District of Columbia. The Jewish community Center became Building T-5. However, within the next 15 years, the college made the decision it no longer needed the building. The city considered using it as a site for a prison, or as a shelter for the homeless. However, "Then a strange thing happened. The District's single Jewish population soared."

With this resurgence of Jews in the District, the Rockville JCC opened a downtown D.C. branch in 1979, and that branch "declared its independence in 1985. As the Jewish population in the District continued to grow, the Jewish community repurchased the original building in 1990. After extensive restoration, the JCC opened for the second time on January 12, 1997, with a display of photographs and artifacts that document the demise and rebirth of urban Jewish spaces in America, such as the JCC itself.

In 2014, the JCC cancelled an invitation for The Shondes, a Brooklyn-based Jewish feminist punk rock band, after a band member questioned whether the State of Israel had a right to exist. In the same year, the JCC withdrew an invitation to David Harris-Gershon, who planned to speak about his wife's serious injury from a Palestinian terrorist's bomb in Jerusalem, following the discovery that Harris-Gershon had written blog posts supportive of the Boycott, Divestment and Sanctions movement.

== Programs and services ==
=== Morris Cafritz Center for the Arts ===
The JCC's Morris Cafritz Center for the Arts is named in honor of the DC real estate developer Morris Cafritz. JCC programs for the Arts include live theater, films, and music, along with the occasional literary event. Theater J provides theater productions, plus play readings, and discussions on the themes of their theater series, often including the playwright, director, or actors. In addition to the annual Washington Jewish Film Festival, one of the largest in North America, "The Screening Room" is a year-round program of full-length features, documentaries, and short films from the around the world, almost always accompanied by discussions led by film makers and film scholars. The music festival features music from the international "Jewish scene", from klezmer to jazz, and from classical to hip-hop and fusion. The literary series, "Authors Out Loud", brings in authors to sign and discuss their latest works, and many other special events, including prose and poetry readings and special lectures, often co-sponsored with other area organizations, provide opportunities to explore and learn about developments in Jewish magazines, the internet, and writing in Hebrew and Yiddish. Special art exhibitions are displayed at the Ann Loeb Bronfman Gallery, and are always free to the public. Past exhibits have featured artists such as Ben Shahn, Andy Warhol, Jules Feiffer, Leonard Baskin, Godfrey Frankel, Helen Levitt, Yefim Ladyzhensky, Siona Benjamin and Mindy Weisel.

=== Jewish living ===
Throughout the year, a series of retreats and special events focus on Jewish thoughts, ideas, and experiences, such as "Faces of Israel", an exploration of religion and state seeking ways different Israelis understand their lives in a nation that is both a "Jewish State" and a democracy. The Center's "Open University" offers both one-time special events, including speakers and films, and ongoing classes and study groups. Programs have included "Dialogues and Public Affairs", an ongoing series of dialogues and discussions on Jewish issues including Mid-East affairs, and "J on Demand", social programs to bring together young professionals in the D.C. area.

In addition to special and ongoing activities at the Center, the EDCJCC also sponsors trips to destinations in the United States and around the world, under the heading of "JCC Travel". One example is the June 2010 trip, "Rome Judaica", which includes visits to the Great Synagogue of Rome, the Jewish Museum, and the Via del Portico d'Ottavia, the old Jewish ghetto now transformed into a setting for Jewish shops and kosher restaurants.

=== Jewish worship and interfaith understanding ===
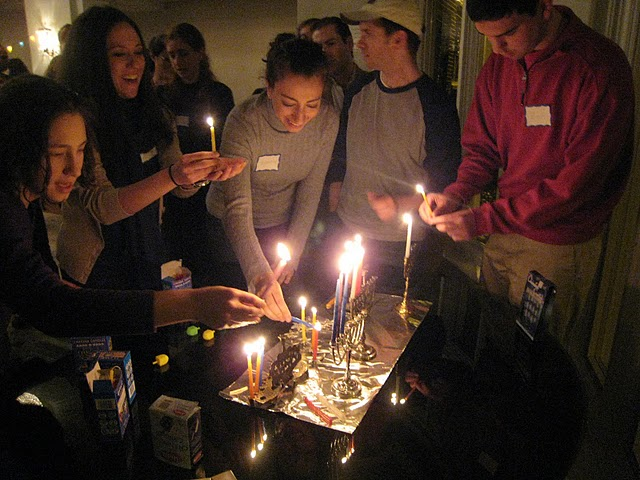
Members of the DC Minyan light candles in celebration of the Festival of Hanukkah.

The EDCJCC is the home for two Jewish community congregations, the DC Minyan, a lay-led congregation that leads "traditional egalitarian" worship services and joins together for study as part of a movement following the model of a growing group of communities in the United States and overseas, such as Bet Mishpachah, "a congregation for Gay, Lesbian, Bisexual, and Transgender Jews and all who wish to participate in an inclusive, egalitarian, and mutually supportive community."

In addition to these Jewish religious resources, "Interfaith Connections" is a program that welcomes interfaith couples, in an attempt to explore the "heritage, tradition and spirituality of both partners." Special presentations, courses, workshops for interfaith couples, and a series of interfaith couples Shabbat dinners are among the programs offered.

=== Tikkun olam ===
In the Jewish spirit of tikkun olam, repairing, mending, and transforming the world, the Center sponsors many programs where both members and non-members can volunteer their time and energy to help others. "Camp Yad B'Yad" (Hand in Hand) trains students from grades 6 through 12 in ways "one person can make a difference" to the community in the areas of cooking, feeding, playing, organizing, and building. "Everything but the Turkey" is a Thanksgiving Day of service and outreach to the homeless and the hungry. "December 25th Day of Service" involves more than 1000 men and women of all ages and all religious backgrounds, working together to serve meals to the homeless, to entertain seniors and children, to renovate and paint shelters, and even to donate blood. Similar efforts are undertaken on other holidays, including Martin Luther King Day, and special dates are set to work on community projects, such as cleaning areas along the river and planting new flowers, trees, and plants, to help the environment.

=== Sports and fitness ===
The Center's sports and fitness programs include individual and group classes and training, including exercises and disciplines such as "Kung Fu-Qigong-Tai Chi Fusion Class", "Zumba, "Cardio Funk", and "Butts and Guts". Aquatic programs include classes for all ages, starting with "Little Flipper" classes for four-month-old infants. Additionally, sports leagues bring men and women together for activities including soccer, volleyball, softball, and basketball. The EDCJCC also supports the JCC Maccabi Youth Games, an annual event sponsored by the JCC Association in affiliation with the United States Olympic Committee.

== See also ==
- Lillian & Albert Small Jewish Museum
- National Museum of American Jewish Military History
- Sixteenth Street Historic District
- Sixth & I Historic Synagogue
- United States Holocaust Memorial Museum
