= Mishkan (disambiguation) =

Mishkan is the Hebrew word for the dwelling place of God, or the Tabernacle. It may refer to:

- The Israelite tabernacle
- Mishkan Chicago, a Progressive Jewish Spiritual Community
- The Mishkan T'filah, an American Reform Jewish Prayer Book
