= Gordon Tucker =

American rabbi

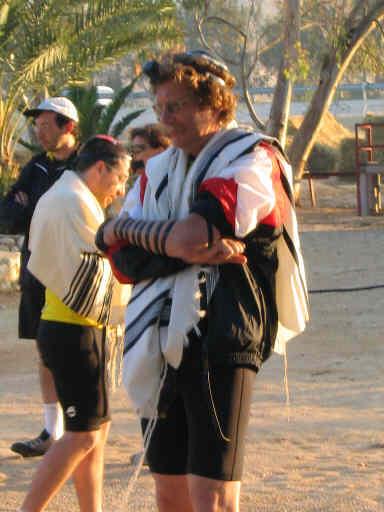
Rabbi Gordon Tucker participates in an early morning minyan, 2003

Gordon Tucker is a prominent rabbi, with a reputation as both a political and a theological liberal in Conservative Judaism. He is the former senior rabbi of Temple Israel Center in White Plains, New York. Since September 2020, he has served as the Vice Chancellor for Religious Life and Engagement at the Jewish Theological Seminary of America.

== Education and career ==
A 1967 graduate of the Bronx High School of Science, Tucker holds the A.B. degree from Harvard College and a PhD. (in Philosophy) from Princeton University. He was ordained a Rabbi in 1975 by The Jewish Theological Seminary of America (JTS). He has served on the faculty of JTS since 1976, currently serving as Adjunct Assistant Professor of Jewish philosophy, in addition to his duties as a congregational rabbi. From 1984 to 1992 he served as dean of the Rabbinical School at JTS. He subsequently became rabbi of Temple Israel Center in White Plains, New York, following the retirement of Rabbi Arnold S. Turetsky.

Tucker has served as chairman of the Board of the Masorti Foundation for Conservative Judaism in Israel, and as a member of the Committee on Jewish Law and Standards of the Rabbinical Assembly.

In 2006, his name was listed as one of the frontrunners for the Chancellor of the Jewish Theological Seminary of America, to replace Chancellor Ismar Schorsch upon his retirement. Arnold Eisen was ultimately chosen for the position.

== Philosophy of Conservative Judaism ==
Tucker, in his writings about the Torah and the nature of divine revelation, is a leader within Conservative Judaism in articulating a position between the traditional view that the Torah is of divine origin, and a secular view, in which the Torah is seen entirely as a work of human creation. He writes, "It is the particular characteristic of Conservative Judaism to insist that religious authority is a partnership, that it comes from the reality of a revealing God and the equally inescapable reality of a seeking, evolving community through which God's words get expressed over time." The Torah, according to Tucker, "is not a record of commanding utterances from God, but rather a record of the religious quests of a people, and of their understanding of how God’s will commands them."

Tucker's liberalism and interest in philosophy reflect his role in Conservative Judaism as a leading scholar and interpreter of the works of Abraham Joshua Heschel (1907–1972). Heschel, a rabbi who escaped the Holocaust in Europe through the help of Hebrew Union College and ultimately joined the faculty of Jewish Theological Seminary, became famous not only for his many religious and philosophical commentaries, but also for his social activism and support of the civil rights movement.

In the 1950s and '60s, the two most famous scholars at Jewish Theological Seminary were Heschel and Mordechai Kaplan (1881–1983). Gordon Tucker began his studies at Jewish Theological Seminary at a time when both Kaplan and Heschel were living. Both Kaplan and Heschel confronted more traditional elements within Conservative Judaism, but each of them sought to redefine Judaism in different ways. While Kaplan favored a positivist, rationalist, and scientific approach to Judaism, Heschel's approach was philosophical, mystical, and spiritual. In effect, Heschel and Kaplan offered competing approaches to the liberalization of Jewish theology.

Gordon Tucker's liberalism could be said to reflect Heschel's own political activism. According to Neil Gillman, a historian of Conservative Judaism, "Heschel insisted that his turn to political activism was prompted by his experience of living in Europe in the decades before World War II. He had been a personal witness to political oppression and was painfully aware that many otherwise good people stood on the sidelines and did not intervene. He was not going to repeat that pattern in America." Heschel's mystical spirituality lead him to become a champion within American Jewry of liberal causes and political activism.

But Tucker is not a follower of Heschel, in the same sense that Kaplan had followers within Conservative Judaism. Rather, he is a follower of what he understands to be Heschel's tradition. For Tucker, Jewish law cannot be expressed solely through a positivist legal framework. It is motivated by an underlying and evolving sense of God's will through a process in which human beings play a critical role. To find precedent for changing Jewish law, Tucker analyzes evolving Jewish moral and legal traditions. Just as Heschel did, he turns to aggadah, the non-legalistic writings that are part of the oral and written tradition of Torah scholarship. He writes that Judaism has developed a precedent over time that rejects "the practice of punishing people, and causing them undue suffering, for things they are not responsible for." Ultimately, his proposal for a new halakhic response to homosexuality was based on this precedent.

== Proposed takkanah on homosexuality ==
Tucker's prominence as both a political and theological liberal within Conservative Judaism is reflected in the role he played in the movement's 2006 debates on the issue of homosexuality. As a member of the Committee on Jewish Law and Standards (CJLS), he authored a proposed teshuvah (responsa) arguing that the biblical prohibition on male homosexuality should be overturned. In doing so, he proposed that the Conservative movement should accept a new, more liberal approach to halakhah (Jewish law). (Tucker originally offered his paper as a responsum, but the committee voted instead to consider it as a takkanah, requiring 13 votes for adoption.)

An important difference between Conservative and Orthodox Judaism is that Conservative Judaism empowers modern rabbis to issue takkanot (decrees) modifying Biblical prohibitions, when perceived to be necessary. However, such decrees must be rooted in halakhic process and precedent. Conservative Judaism has adopted takkanot only for a few exceptional matters, such as the abolition of the biblical category of mamzer (a child whose mother is married to a someone other than the biological father or is the product of an incestuous relationship). Orthodox Judaism takes a more limited view as to how law can be changed.

Both Conservative and Orthodox Judaism address most questions of Jewish law through responsa, through a written, rabbinical interpretation of Jewish law, analogous to a court decision. In Orthodox Judaism, responsa are the product of individual rabbis, and their authority derives from the recognition of the author within the larger Orthodox community as a posek or decisor. In Conservative Judaism, both responsa and takkanot are products of the Committee on Jewish Law and Standards, whose voting members are ordained rabbis within the Conservative movement.

On December 6, 2006, The CJLS adopted three different responsa, somewhat contradictory, on issues that address the participation of male homosexuals in Conservative Judaism:

- By 13 of 25 votes, the minimum majority, the CJLS adopted a responsum authored by Rabbi Elliot N. Dorff, Daniel Nevins, and Avraham Reisner, lifting most restrictions on homosexual conduct and opening the way to the ordination of openly gay and lesbian rabbis and acceptance of homosexual unions, but stopping short of religiously recognizing gay marriage. The responsum maintained the Biblical prohibition on male-male anal sex.
- Also by 13 of 25 votes, the committee adopted a traditionalist responsum, by Rabbi Joel Roth, reaffirming a general prohibition on homosexual conduct.
- By six votes, the minimum for adoption as a minority position, the committee approved another responsum by Rabbi Leonard Levy, delineating ways in which to ensure that gays and lesbians would be accorded human dignity and a respected place in Conservative communities and institutions while maintaining the authority of the traditional prohibitions against same-sex sexual activity.

The Committee rejected Gordon Tucker's takkanah. Details of this issue are discussed in Conservative Halakha. Tucker's proposed takkanah became, in effect, a dissenting opinion.

== Translation and commentary on Heschel ==
Rabbi Tucker's most widely known scholarly work is his translation with notes and commentaries of writings of Abraham Joshua Heschel. Tucker translated Heschel's Torah min HaShamayim BeAspaklariah shel HaDorot (Heavenly Torah as Refracted through the Generations) from the original Hebrew into English, and provided many notes, essays, and commentaries.

In her forward to Heavenly Torah, Heschel's daughter Susannah Heschel describes the scope and magnitude of this translation. "Gordon Tucker (and Rabbi Leonard Levin) have done a superb job of assembling, editing, abridging, and translating a huge, not-quite-finished manuscript. Others literally died trying to translate this sprawling masterpiece. There may be some dissent from the inevitable omissions, some few typos, some doubts about Tucker's interpretations. But on the whole, the introductions to each chapter, the explanatory notes on almost every page (including identifying Heschel's often obscure sources) are wonderful aids in working through this massive work."

Heschel differed with the more legalistic approach to Torah of the Lithuanian rabbis who dominated the interpretation of halacha and the exegesis of Torah in the 20th century. He emphasized aggadah and midrash, the often speculative writings of the rabbinical sages that were outside the Torah's legal framework. Because these writings were not as heavily edited or redacted as the Mishna and Gemara, Heschel's Hebrew manuscript reflects a variety of difficult Hebrew prose styles. Or N. Rose, a reviewer of Heavenly Torah, praised Tucker and Levin for capturing the qualities of Heschel's original manuscript in their translation. "Not only is this English version a lucid and thoughtful reworking of the original text, but Tucker and Levin even manage to introduce into their translation a measure of the poeticism readers have come to expect of Heschel."

== Family life ==
Tucker is currently married to Dr. Amy Cohn, with whom he has a son and daughter, Micah and Becky. He was previously married to Hadassah Freilich (now Lieberman), with whom he has a son, Rabbi Ethan Tucker, a rosh yeshiva at Yeshivat Hadar. His first wife later married Senator Joseph Lieberman, who became the first Jewish candidate for national office with a major political party.

== Sources ==
- All Eyes On Rabbi Tucker At Panel, The Jewish Week
- Hazon Bio
- Temple Israel of White Plains bio (official)
- Forward article
- Haber, Gedalia. "Lost In Translation: Abraham Joshua Heschel's 'Heavenly Torah'—A Review Essay". Modern Judaism, volume 29, number 3, October 2009, pp. 405–427.
- Heschel, Abraham Joshua. Heavenly Torah: As Refracted through the Generations. Edited and Translated with Commentary by Gordon Tucker with Leonard Levin. (New York, London: Continuum, 2004)
- Rose, Or N. Heavenly Torah in Human Hands JBooks.com, the Online Jewish Book Community.
- Tucker, Gordon. Halakhic and Metahalakhic Arguments Concerning Judaism and Homosexuality
- Tucker, Gordon. "The Importance of Orientation: Etz Hayyim and the Conservative Jewish Perspective." United Synagogue Review. Spring 2003
