= Joelle Novey =

- Born: 1979-1980; Baltimore
- Education: Harvard University (BA)
- Occupations: activist, writer

Joelle Novey is the director of Greater Washington Interfaith Power & Light and a founder of Tikkun Leil Shabbat, an independent Jewish community in Washington DC. In 2012, she was named one of "13 Religious Women to Watch" by the Center for American Progress. In 2014, she was awarded the "Advisory Advocate" Award from the Maryland Clean Energy Center. In 2017, the Times of Israel named her one of the "12 Jews who are leading the green movement," recognizing her work as an organizer of the People's Climate March (2017). In 2024, she was one of six local environmental leaders featured in large-scale projected portraits at Strathmore Music Center. She is a magna cum laude graduate of Harvard University.

== Publications ==
- "Our Sponges Are Praying: How a Dish System Reflects Pluralism, Environmentalism, Egalitarianism, and Community at Tikkun Leil Shabbat in Washington, DC"
- "Green and Just Celebrations," a purchasing guide to assist families in making greener purchasing decisions around celebrations.
- "What We're Missing in the Trayon White Conversation," Washington Post Op-Ed
- "Religions should work together to repair climate," Baltimore Sun Op-Ed
