= Shawn Landres =

J. Shawn Landres (born 1972 in Los Angeles, California) is a social entrepreneur and independent scholar, and local civic leader, known for applied research related to charitable giving and faith-based social innovation and community development, as well as for innovation in government and civic engagement.

== Education ==
Landres graduated from Columbia University in 1994 and received a master's degrees from Oxford in Social Anthropology and the University of California, Santa Barbara, in Religious Studies, as well as a Doctorate in Religious Studies from the University of California, Santa Barbara. Landres' work on ethnographic methodology has been cited in handbooks for the study of the sociology of religion.

In 2004, Landres took a public role in shaping the interreligious response to the film The Passion of the Christ.

== Awards and recognition ==
The Jewish Daily Forward named Landres to its annual list of the 50 most influential American Jews in 2009. He is the co-founder of Jumpstart, a nonprofit philanthropic research organization,.

In 2013 Landres was awarded the Liberty Hill Foundation's NextGen Leadership Award.^{[31]} The Southern California Leadership Network (a program of the Los Angeles Area Chamber of Commerce) named him as one of its 30th anniversary "30-in-30" alumni honorees in 2017.

A co-founder (with Rabbi Lawrence A. Hoffman) of Synagogue 3000's Synagogue Studies Institute, Landres is credited with creating the term "Jewish Emergent," which describes new spiritual Jewish communities that have an institutional dynamic in which "relationship, not contract or program, is the driving metaphor;" the term "Jewish Emergent" reflects similarities in organizing philosophy with a parallel movement in the Christian church. A 2007 report Landres co-authored with sociologist Steven M. Cohen and others linked Jewish Emergent communities to social networking rather than institutional structures. They argued that "Jewish Emergent" encompasses both the independent minyan movement (which was supported by Synagogue 3000) and so-called "rabbi-led emergent" communities such as IKAR and Kavana Cooperative. In 2006, Landres co-convened the first gathering of Emergent church and "Jewish Emergent" leaders in a meeting co-led by theologian Tony Jones, who recounted the episode in one of his books. In 2016, a network of rabbi-led emergent communities established the Jewish Emergent Network, crediting Landres for coining the concept behind its name.

== Political engagement ==
Landres worked with the White House during the Presidency of Barack Obama on Jewish affairs and issues related to faith-based social enterprise.

In July 2012, the Obama White House invited Landres, representing Jumpstart, to speak as a "spotlight innovator" at its Faith-Based Social Innovators Conference.

Bill Clinton has identified him as the "young man" who suggested "Don't Stop" as the future president's 1992 campaign theme song.

== Research ==
In 2013-14, Landres chaired the research team and co-authored five of Jumpstart's six Connected to Give reports, which "map[ped] the landscape of charitable giving by Americans of different faith traditions." Connected to Give was credited by Indiana University as a "breakthrough finding" distinguishing giving to religious congregations and giving to "religiously identified organizations." and has continued to be cited in research reports on philanthropy..

In 2016 Landres co-authored "The Generosity Gap: Donating Less in Post-Recession Los Angeles County" for the California Community Foundation and the UCLA Luskin School of Public Affairs, described as a model for research on locally focused giving

== Local political roles ==
Landres chaired the Los Angeles County Quality and Productivity Commission from 2017 to 2019^{[35]}.

In 2018, Landres was appointed to the City of Santa Monica Planning Commission. He has stated his opposition to medium-term housing for non-residents. However, as a commissioner and as chair while the City of Santa Monica was updating its required Housing Element in response to its Regional Housing Needs Assessment allocation, Landres took positions generally favoring increasing residential density, including in single-family neighborhoods Prior to his planning commission appointment, Landres had chaired the City of Santa Monica's Social Services Commission,^{[32]} where he focused on homelessness and on accounting for social services in land-use planning. He is a member of the Santa Monica-Malibu Unified School District Financial Oversight Committee. and co-chaired a 2018 bond measure campaign for SMMUSD facilities, which passed despite opposition from homeowners and renters concerned about increased taxes and fees. Previously he chaired the Santa Monica Public Library's Innovation Technology Task Force.

== Academic roles ==
UCLA's Luskin School of Public Affairs appointed him as a Civil Society Fellow in 2015 and as a Senior Fellow in 2016. He serves on the board of directors of the Santa Monica Bay Area Human Relations Council and was a founding organizing committee member of Jews United for Democracy and Justice, formed in response to "rising threats to religious tolerance, equal rights, a free and fair press, human dignity, and long-held norms of decency and civil society."

In 2019 Landres initiated the idea for CIVruta, a Los Angeles-based training initiative aimed at "encouraging and equipping [community leaders from different backgrounds] to bring the Jewishly informed democratic values of diversity, inclusion, and dignity to service on local boards and commissions." It was awarded the Lippman Kanfer Prize for Applied Jewish Wisdom funded by the Lippman Kanfer Foundation for Living Torah (created by the founders of Gojo Industries) and the Democracy Fund.

== COVID pandemic ==
During the COVID pandemic, Landres has served on the County of Los Angeles Prosper LA Working Group, helping oversee a National Association of Counties Achievement Award-winning initiative to "streamline the County's contracting process, assist businesses, and identify potential cost-savings to County operations.". Landres also serves on the City of Santa Monica Economic Recovery Task Force.

In November 2020 and April 2021 Landres published two syndicated op-eds calling for reform of California's Brown Act to enable remote participation by the public in local government. He has advocated for public participation reform and for increased public access to government decision-making.

== Books ==
Landres's books include:

- Personal Knowledge and Beyond: Reshaping the Ethnography of Religion (edited with James Spickard and Meredith Mcguire, New York University Press, 2002)
- After the Passion is Gone: American Religious Consequences (edited with Michael Berenbaum, AltaMira Press, 2004)
- Religion, Violence, Memory and Place (edited with Oren Baruch Stier, Indiana University Press, 2006)

== See also ==
- Emerging church
- Independent minyan
- Jumpstart (Jewish)
