= Shai Held =

American academic

Shai Held (born July 2, 1971) is President, Dean, and Chair in Jewish Thought at the Hadar Institute, which he co-founded in 2006 with Rabbis Elie Kaunfer and Ethan Tucker.

== Education ==
Held attended Ramaz High School and studied at Yeshivat HaMivtar in Efrat, Israel. Held earned his B.A. from Harvard University in Religion, and went on to earn his M.A. in Jewish philosophy at the Jewish Theological Seminary in addition to rabbinic ordination. He earned a PhD from Harvard University in Religious Studies; his dissertation is titled Reciprocity and Responsiveness: Self-Transcendence and the Dynamics of Covenant in the Theology and Spirituality of Abraham Joshua Heschel.

== Career ==
Held worked at the Harvard University Hillel from 1999-2002 as the Conservative Rabbinic Advisor and the Director of Education. He has taught at Meah at Hebrew College, the Rabbinic Training Institute at the Jewish Theological Seminary, the Skirball Center for Adult Jewish Learning, and synagogues and institutions across the country. He was an adjunct professor of Jewish Philosophy, Talmud and Rabbinics, and Informal Jewish Education at the Jewish Theological Seminary from 2005-2008. From 2003-2008 Held was the scholar-in-residence at Kehilat Hadar, an independent minyan (congregation) in New York City.

In 2006 Held co-founded Mechon Hadar: An Institute for Prayer, Personal Growth, and Jewish Study. He has taught Modern Jewish Thought, Midrash, Talmud, Tanakh, and other topics. He heads the social action program at Yeshivat Hadar, meeting with residents at The New Jewish Home in Manhattan and training students in bikkur holim (visiting the sick).

=== Covenant Award ===
In 2011 Shai was awarded the Covenant Award for excellence in Jewish education. David Ellenson, then-president of Hebrew Union College, wrote in a letter of support that “Rabbi Held could easily have a career as a professor at Harvard or Yale, but has chosen instead to live his life ‘in the trenches,’ helping a generation of Jews take hold of their birthright and find ways to make Judaism meaningful, compelling, and sustaining in the twenty-first century.”

== Publications ==
In 2013 Indiana University Press published Held's first book, Abraham Joshua Heschel: The Call of Transcendence, a study of the major themes of the theologian's thought, particularly the movement from reflexive concern, where man thinks of his own needs and those of his family and community, to transitive concern, where he rises above the self to view the needs of the world from the broader perspective of God rather than his from his own ego. In 2017, the Jewish Publication Society published The Heart of Torah, a collection of essays on the Hebrew Bible in two volumes, which is one of the most widely cited contemporary Torah commentaries. Held brings together traditional Jewish commentary with modern academic biblical scholarship.

In March 2024 Farrar, Straus and Giroux published Held's Judaism Is About Love: Recovering the Heart of Jewish Life.

Held has also published numerous articles:

- "Living and Dreaming with God," in Jewish Theology in Our Time, ed. Elliot J. Cosgrove (Jewish Lights, 2010). Available on GoogleBooks.
- "Wonder and Indignation: Abraham's Uneasy Faith," Jewish Review of Books, Winter 2013.
- "On Faith Beyond Perception: The Slonimer Rebbe," in Jewish Mysticism and the Spiritual Life, ed. Lawrence Fine, Etian Fishbane, and Or N. Rose (Jewish Lights, 2011).
- “Hadesh Yamenu,” on the future of Conservative Judaism, Judaism, Summer-Fall 2005.
- “The Promise and Peril of Jewish Barthianism: The Theology of Michael Wyschogrod,” Modern Judaism, October 2005.
- “Compassion-Judaism,” entry in The Encyclopedia of Love in World Religions, ed. Yudit Kornberg Greenberg (Santa Barbara: ABC-CLIO, 2008).

== Theology ==
Held interprets Judaism as a "religion of love."

“My aspiration for Yeshivat Hadar, and for my own teaching, is that we teach a Torat Hesed, a Torah of love and kindness, a Torah that reminds us that every step we take towards God is a step towards—not away from—the world. As I often remind students, if being present in the face of others' pain were easy, Torah wouldn't describe it as the culmination of the religious life.”

Held teaches that “to cleave to God’s ways” means to manifest hesed (loving kindness). He often says that “Judaism dreams of a world in which human dignity is real and the presence of God is manifest.”

== Personal ==
Held married Rachel Forster on October 28, 2007.

== Additional Reading ==
- Rabbi Shai Held's Blog, on The Times of Israel
- Shai Held talks about Judaism and love. The Jewish Standard, 23 October 2025
- How Rabbi Shai Held is shaping the conversation around love and politics. The Times of Israel, 1 September 2017
