= Lawrence Hoffman =

Lawrence or Larry Hoffman may refer to:

- Larry Hoffman (baseball) (1878–1948), 1900s infielder for the Chicago Orphans
- Lawrence A. Hoffman (born 1942), liturgiologist
- H. Lawrence Hoffman, book jacket designer, illustrator, calligrapher and painter
