= Temple Israel Center =

Synagogue in White Plains, New York

- Location in New York

Religion
- Affiliation: Conservative Judaism
- Ecclesiastical or organizational status: Synagogue
- Leadership: Rabbi Annie Tucker; Rabbi Gordon Tucker (Emeritus)
- Status: Active

Location
- Location: 280 Old Mamaroneck Road, White Plains, New York
- Country: United States
- Interactive map of Temple Israel Center
- Coordinates: 41°00′23″N 73°45′46″W

Architecture
- Established: 1907 (as a congregation)
- Completed: 1947 (current location)
- Capacity: 500 worshippers

Website
- www.templeisraelcenter.org

Temple Israel Center is an egalitarian Conservative Jewish congregation and synagogue in White Plains, New York, in the United States.

The synagogue is led by Rabbi Annie Tucker. Rabbi Gordon Tucker is the Rabbi Emeritus.
