= Elie Kaunfer =

American rabbi

Elie Kaunfer (b. 1973) is an American rabbi who serves as president and CEO of Yeshivat Hadar in Manhattan. Kaunfer has been named as a leading American rabbi by The Forward and Newsweek.

== Career ==
Kaunfer earned a BA from Harvard College and received a doctorate from the Jewish Theological Seminary of America; his dissertation concerned Jewish liturgy. Kaunfer was a co-founder and served as the executive director of Mechon Hadar (Hadar Institute), also known as Yeshivat Hadar. He was also a co-founder of the independent minyan Kehilat Hadar affiliated with the institute. Additionally, he served as a fellow at the Avi Chai Foundation. Aside from his rabbinic role at Hadar, Kaunfer worked in journalism and banking.

=== Publications ===
Kaunfer authored a book (with a preface by Jonathan Sarna) on the rise of independent Jewish congregations and their contribution to building Jewish communities:

- Empowered Judaism: What Independent Minyanim Can Teach Us about Building Vibrant Jewish Communities (Jewish Lights, 2010).

Other publications include:

- Kaunfer, E. (2019) Applying Jewish Wisdom to Philanthropy: The Case of Aggripas and the Sages, Journal of Jewish Education 85(4), 349-361.

== See also ==
- Shai Held
- Ethan Tucker
