= Kol Zimrah =

Independent minyan in Manhattan, New York

Coordinates: 40°47′4.1″N 73°58′18.4″W

Religion
- Affiliation: Judaism
- Rite: Unaffiliated
- Leadership: Lay-led
- Status: Inactive

Location
- Location: Upper West Side, Manhattan, New York City, New York
- Country: United States
- Interactive map of Kol Zimrah

Architecture
- Established: 2002 (as a congregation)

Website
- kolzimrah.info

Kol Zimrah (transliterated from Hebrew as "Voice of Song") is an unaffiliated Jewish congregation, also called an independent minyan or chavurah, that is based on the Upper West Side of Manhattan, in New York City, New York, United States.

== Overview ==
Founded in 2002, the congregation's motto is "meaningful prayer through music". It does not identify itself with any of the established Jewish religious movements, and has a style of prayer that does not fit neatly into the styles associated with any of them.

The congregation met regularly for Friday night services which combined Hebrew language liturgy with musical instruments and singing.

Like other chavurot, Kol Zimrah had no rabbi or other professional leadership, and was run completely by volunteers. It used a "two-table" system at its potluck dinners (one table with vegetarian food, and one table with vegetarian food in which all ingredients have kashrut certification) in order to accommodate different standards of kashrut in a pluralistic community.

Kol Zimrah had a "sibling" relationship with Tikkun Leil Shabbat in Washington, D.C., one of the few other congregations that has services in the same style (musical instruments and the traditional structure of the liturgy).

Kol Zimrah ceased activities after 2014.
