= Hadassah Lieberman =

American health relations specialist (born 1948)

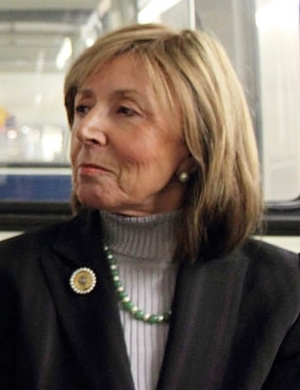
- Lieberman in 2011
- Born: Hadassah Freilich; March 28, 1948 (age 78); Prague, Czechoslovakia
- Education: Boston University (BA); Northeastern University (MA)
- Spouse(s): Rabbi Gordon Tucker Joe Lieberman (m. 1982; died 2024)
- Children: 4, including Ethan

Hadassah Lieberman (née Freilich; born March 28, 1948) is an American health relations specialist, nonprofit executive, author, and the widow of former United States Senator Joe Lieberman of Connecticut.

== Life and work ==
Hadassah Freilich Lieberman was born in Prague, Czechoslovakia (a past report erroneously stated she was born in a refugee camp) to Jewish parents who were both Holocaust survivors. Her father was Samuel Freilich, a lawyer and rabbi from Munkács, in the Carpathian Ruthenia (now Mukachevo in Ukraine). Her mother, Ella (Wieder) Freilich, had survived both Auschwitz and Dachau. Hadassah was named for her maternal grandmother, who was murdered at Auschwitz. Samuel Freilich brought his family to the United States, in 1949, settling in Gardner, Massachusetts, where he was the rabbi of Congregation Ohave Shalom. Lieberman graduated from Gardner High School in 1966.

Lieberman is an Orthodox Jew who keeps kosher, walks to synagogue on Shabbat, and sent her daughter to an Orthodox Jewish day school.

Lieberman received a Bachelor of Arts degree in Government and Dramatics from Boston University in 1970, as well as an MA in International Relations from Northeastern University the following year. She was a research analyst at Lehman Brothers, a director of Policy, Planning, and Communications at Pfizer, and a senior program officer at the National Research Council. She worked on health issues, assisting nonprofit organizations, improving educational standards, and promoting international understanding. She has served on several national nonprofit councils and boards. Lieberman continues to be vocal on many issues, which includes improving women's health, reducing hurdles faced by immigrants, and the challenge of caring for aging parents.

Lieberman was also a member of the Parents Music Resource Center. Rolling Stone magazine stated that she "is an active proponent of the V-Chip and [has served] on the board of the PTC".

She worked for the lobbying company APCO Associates, which serves many pharmaceutical and health care corporations, as well as four major drug companies. In March 2005, Lieberman was hired by Hill & Knowlton as "senior counselor" in the firm's "health care and pharmaceuticals practice". Her work with the pharmaceutical and healthcare industries led to controversy over her involvement with the Susan G. Komen for the Cure Foundation.

Lieberman also served as Chairman of the Ambassador's Ball for the National Multiple Sclerosis Society, and as Honorary Board Member for Society for Women's Health Research.

She was actively involved in her husband's vice presidential campaign in 2000, making campaign stops nationwide, including Chicago's Taste of Polonia over the Labor Day Weekend, where she appeared along with Tipper Gore and Dick Cheney. As spouse of the vice presidential nominee, Lieberman spoke at the 2000 Democratic National Convention.

== Books ==
- Hadassah: An American Story (Brandeis, 2021).
- An Amazing Adventure: Joe and Hadassah's Personal Notes on the 2000 Campaign (2002)
