= Lawrence A. Hoffman =

American Reform rabbi and liturgiologist

Lawrence A. Hoffman (born 1942) is an American Reform rabbi and liturgiologist—particularly known for his studies of Jewish liturgy. He is known for his liberal religious views.

Hoffman is Professor of Liturgy at Hebrew Union College in New York City. He is a prolific author, writing two books often used as Jewish liturgical guides. His work examines the means of improving the quality of praying for secular Jews. He has explored issues of liturgical change but is most interested in the "community at prayer"—human and divine relationships in prayer.

Hoffman was a co-founder of the Synagogue Studies Institute, also known as Synagogue 2000/3000, alongside Ron Wolfson. The institute was an independent non-profit organization that conducted leadership-training programs and facilitated rituals in over 100 synagogues across North America.

== Academic career ==
Hoffman's first book came out in 1979, but he remained unknown outside of his field until the publication of his magnum opus, Beyond the Text: A Holistic Approach to Liturgy, in 1987. His recent work involves translating medieval and ancient sources for secular Jewish congregations. Two of his books have been adopted by North American churches and synagogues as a guide to liturgical renewal.

Hoffman rose to prominence within the liturgical studies community following the publication of Beyond the Text: A Holistic Approach to Liturgy in 1987. The methods he uses to translate Jewish texts go "beyond the text" and are traced back to the sociologist Peter Berger. Critical reception of the book was mixed. Jack Kugelmass welcomed Hoffman's attempt to make a bridge between Jewish ethnographers and scholars of Jewish religious thought, but predicted the book would not interest anthropologists because Hoffman relies on "limited historical and very thin ethnographic references" to develop his thesis.

Hoffman first gained media attention for a series of articles in the early and mid-1990s advocating a "post-ethnic Judaism", which criticized efforts to turn Hanukah into a multicultural festival. They include:

- "On being a Jew at Christmas", Cross Currents magazine, Fall 1992
- "What do American Jews believe?", Commentary magazine, August 1996

Hoffman's recent work involves translating medieval and ancient sources in terms of "reasonable spirituality", which grasps the underlying spirituality of Jewish tradition without conceptualizing it in a purely sociocultural or theological way.

== Personal views ==
Hoffman supports interfaith dialogue and is a signatory to the Dabru Emet. He is one of the few Reform rabbis working in association with the emerging church to transform both synagogues and churches: in January 2006, Synagogue 3000 hosted a landmark conference which brought together emerging church leaders and around a dozen Jewish "emergent" leaders. The meeting, co-organized by Hoffman's Synagogue 3000 colleague Shawn Landres and Emergent church leader Tony Jones, led to the launch of Synagogue 3000's Jewish Emergent Initiative. In December 2007, Rick Warren spoke at the institutes's biannual convention.

== Works ==
Hoffman has written or edited thirty-three books.

His early works include:

- The Canonization of the Synagogue Service (University of Notre Dame Press, 1979)
- Beyond the Text: A Holistic Approach to Liturgy (Indiana University Press, 1987)
- The Art of Public Prayer: Not for Clergy Only (Pastoral Press, 1988)

During the 1990s, he co-edited with Paul F. Bradshaw, a former colleague of his at Notre Dame University, and Janet Walton of Union Theological Seminary a series of five books on the dual liturgical traditions of Christianity and Judaism. The first two books discuss the history of the liturgies and the evolution of worship in Christian and Jewish communities in North America. The final three books were aimed at a more general audience and discuss the meaning of religious holidays, liturgical music and notions of the sacred and the profound.

Later works include:

- Covenant of Blood: Circumcision and Gender in Rabbinic Judaism (University of Chicago Press, 1996)
- The Journey Home: Discovering the Deep Spiritual Wisdom of the Jewish Tradition (Beacon Press, 2002)
- Rethinking Synagogues: A New Vocabulary for Congregational Life (Jewish Lights Publishing, 2006)
- My People's Prayer Book volumes 1-10 (Jewish Lights Publishing, 1997-2007) for which he won the National Jewish Book Award

Shorter articles include:

- Criteria for Evaluating Liturgy (Sh'ma: A Journal of Jewish Responsibility Vol.14/no.264, 1983)
- From Ethnic to Spiritual: A Tale of Four Generations (Synagogue 3000, 1995)
- How Spiritual are America's Jews? with Steven M. Cohen (Synagogue 3000, March 2009)

More articles by Lawrence Hoffman on the Berman Jewish Policy Archive @ NYU Wagner
