= The Kitchen (Jewish community) =

Jewish congregation in San Francisco, California, US

- Location in downtown San Francisco, California

Religion
- Affiliation: Judaism
- Rite: Non-denominational Judaism
- Ecclesiastical or organisational status: Congregation
- Leadership: Rabbi Noa Kushner
- Status: Active

Location
- Location: 2443 Fillmore Street, San Francisco, California 94115 (administration office)
- Country: United States
- Coordinates: 37°47′32″N 122°26′05″W

Architecture
- Founder: Rabbi Noa Kushner
- Established: 2011 (as a congregation)

Website
- thekitchensf.org

The Kitchen is a non-denominational Jewish congregation located in San Francisco, California, in the United States.

The congregation was founded by Rabbi Noa Kushner in 2011 following her work at Congregation Rodef Sholom, as part of an effort "to create something that filled a gap, that met needs that weren’t being met." It describes itself as "one part shabbat + justice + torah community, one part San Francisco experiment and one part tool kit for Jewish life at home." Its services are known for "ecstatic music-driven worship drawing on an unusually expansive array of melodies."Hazzan and oud master Asher Shasho Levy joined the kitchen in 2022. Since joining, he has added many traditional Sephardic elements to the services and helped create a new Siddur that incorporates both Sephardic and Ashkenazik traditions.

The Kitchen focuses on incubating new ways of helping Jews connect with Jewish religion, text, and practices. It partnered with the design firm IDEO to design the congregation's materials and its services. The Kitchen has also engaged in a range of experimental musical outreach efforts; it received a grant from the Covenant Foundation immediately prior to the pandemic to engage in musical outreach, resulting in the creation of an album collecting communal singing traditions.

The Kitchen has a wide range of famous congregants, including writer Bari Weiss and her wife, Nellie Bowles.

As of 2015, it had approximately 200 member households.

The Kitchen is a member of the Jewish Emergent Network.
