= Romemu =

Synagogue in Manhattan, New York

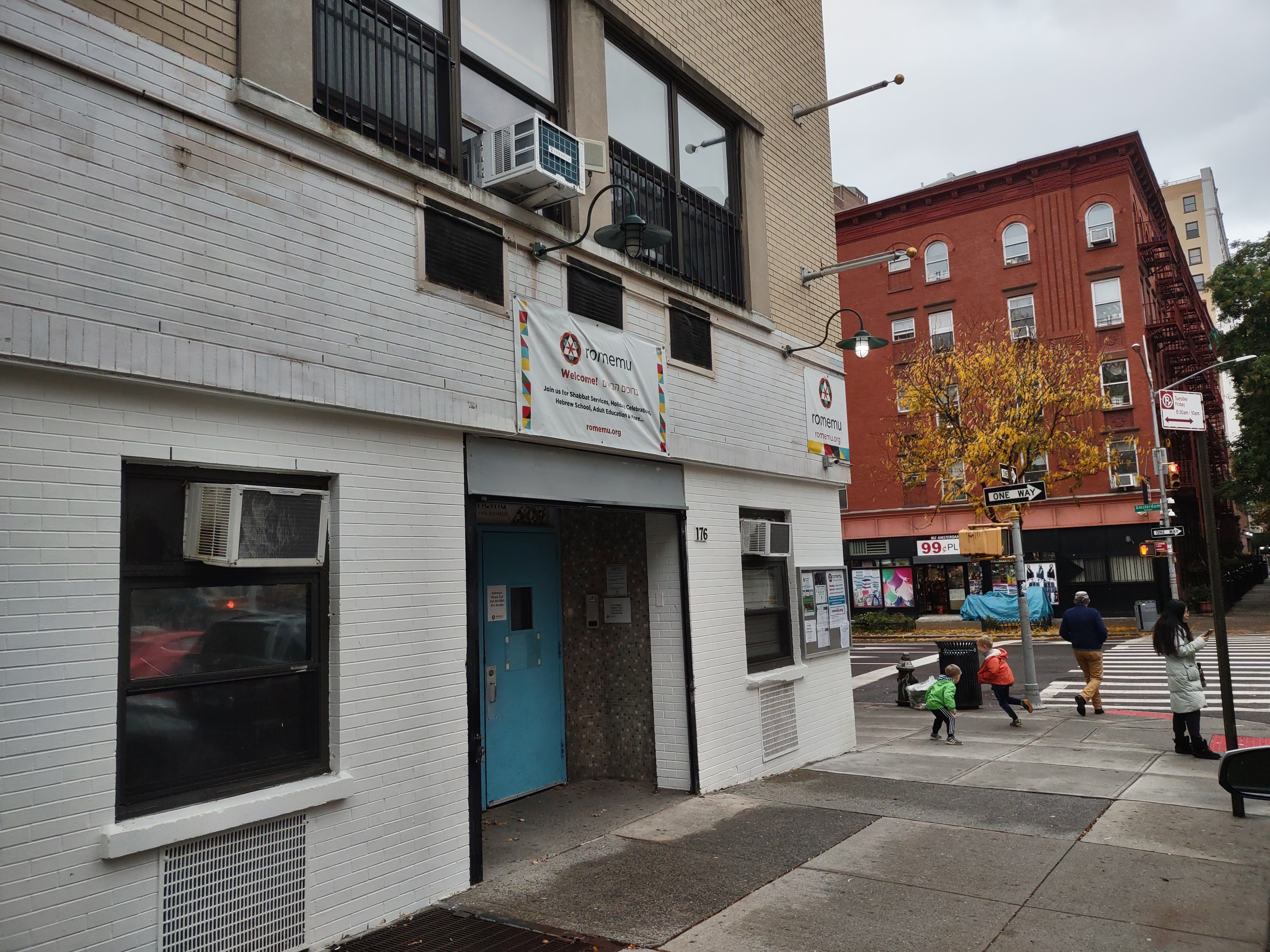

- Location in Manhattan, New York City

Religion
- Affiliation: Judaism
- Rite: Non-denominational Judaism
- Ecclesiastical or organisational status: Congregation
- Leadership: Rabbi David Ingber; Rabbi Dianne Cohler-Esses; Cantor Shimon Smith
- Status: Active

Location
- Location: West End Presbyterian Church, 165 West 105th Street, Upper West Side, Manhattan, New York City, New York 10025
- Country: United States
- Coordinates: 40°47′58″N 73°57′58″W

Architecture
- Founder: Rabbi David Ingber
- Established: 2006 (as a congregation)

Website
- romemu.org

Romemu is a non-denominational Jewish congregation that worships in the West End Presbyterian Church, 165 West 105th Street, on the Upper West Side of Manhattan, in New York City, New York, United States. The congregation was founded by Rabbi David Ingber in March 2006. Romemu holds Shabbat and holiday services and adult education courses and runs the Seekers Hebrew School. Having established itself initially as Romemu Manhattan, the congregation has outreach services as Romemu Brooklyn and Romemu Westchester.

== Overview ==
Romemu describes itself as "a welcoming, experiential, irreverently pious, intergenerational Jewish community that elevates and transforms individuals and communities into more compassionate human beings," and seeks to expand spiritual engagement in Jewish religious practices. The organization is part of the Jewish Renewal movement, and has over 1,500 members.

In 2019, the organization launched an annual summer yeshiva program, Romemu Yeshiva, offering what it described as a "neo-Hasidic" yeshiva experience merging spirituality, mysticism, and meditation with traditional text study.

Romemu is a member of the Jewish Emergent Network.
