= Jumpstart (Jewish) =

Los Angeles-based non-profit

Jumpstart is a Los Angeles-based non-profit that helps support, develop and enhance the effectiveness of projects and organizations initiating from within the Jewish Community.

== History ==
The organization was formed by Shawn Landres and Joshua Avedon (son of Barbara Avedon) in 2008 with a mission "to develop, strengthen, and learn from emerging nonprofit organizations that build community at the nexus of spirituality, learning, social activism, and culture, in order to transform the broader Jewish community and the world."

== Purpose ==
Jumpstart has drawn academic, communal, philanthropic, and media attention to the organizations and people in the loosely organized sector of Jewish nonprofit startups founded independently of communal institutions, sometimes known as the Jewish innovation ecosystem, a term given to that sector in Jumpstart's first report by that name. These include organizations and people in Europe as well as North America.

== Significance ==
The Jerusalem Post said that Jumpstart "has changed the global conversation about Jewish innovation primarily through research and advocacy." Crediting both Avedon and Landres for Jumpstart's work, Jewish Daily Forward named Landres to its annual list of the 50 most influential American Jews in 2009, calling him "an essential thinker in explaining the new Jewish spirituality and culture to the Jewish establishment."

Jumpstart co-sponsored the first meeting of Jewish startup leaders and social entrepreneurs at the White House and subsequently was one of a small number of grassroots Jewish organizations to be represented at the White House's first Jewish American Heritage Month reception in 2010. In July 2012, Jumpstart was invited by the Obama Administration to participate in the White House's Faith-Based Social Innovators Conference, jointly organized by the Obama Administration's Offices of Faith-based and Neighborhood Partnerships and of Social Innovation and Civic Participation. Jumpstart co-founder Shawn Landres was a featured "spotlght innovator" and addressed the conference. Jumpstart subsequently co-organized a Southern California Faith-Based Innovation Forum modeled on the White House conference.

Jumpstart was named one of ten "Maccabim" in 2011 by AbbaNibi.

== See also ==
- Emerging church
- Shawn Landres
