= Tikkun Leil Shabbat =

Independent minyan or chavurah in Washington, DC

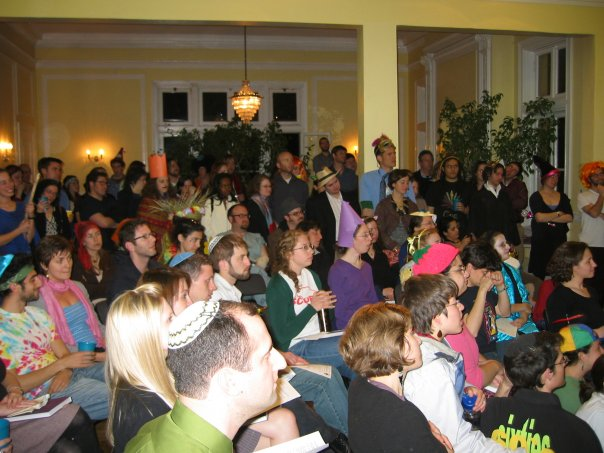
Tikkun Leil Shabbat celebrates Purim

Tikkun Leil Shabbat is an independent minyan or chavurah in Washington, DC, organized entirely by volunteer leadership and sponsored by Jews United for Justice, DC's local Jewish social justice organization. The name of the community is a reference both to Tikkun Leil Shavuot and tikkun olam. Its primary activity is Friday night ("leil Shabbat"), but it also meets on Jewish holidays and at other times. Tikkun Leil Shabbat attracts upward of 200 participants on Friday nights.

Like many minyanim and chavurot, Tikkun Leil Shabbat is not affiliated or identified with any Jewish denomination, and explicitly identifies as a diverse community, composed of "Jews from birth, Jews by choice, people committed to both traditional and non-traditional Jewish practice, non-Jews, and people exploring Judaism; LGBT and straight; people of color, Sefardi, Mizrachi and Ashkenazi; Virginians, Marylanders, DC residents, and people from other places; Conservative, Orthodox, Reconstructionist, Reform, Renewal, secular, and Jewish without labels; people with no formal Jewish education, Jewish educators, and people with all other types of Jewish backgrounds".

The original Tikkun Leil Shabbat was founded in summer 2005 "as a summer experiment with no intention of continuing", but it continued beyond that summer as a result of grassroots demand, meeting in participants' homes. It merged in 2006 with the DC Reform Chavurah, keeping the name Tikkun Leil Shabbat for the combined community, and outgrowing apartments to meet in larger spaces. In order to serve a diverse constituency, the merged community adopted a practice of having TLS services alternate between two styles: circle seating with musical instruments (similar to Kol Zimrah in New York), and row seating without instruments. Both styles include the full Shabbat liturgy in Hebrew.

== Notable innovations ==
Tikkun Leil Shabbat has a focus on social justice, and this is manifested in part through the d'var tikkun at each service. In place of a d'var torah, each TLS service concludes with a speaker from a local organization working on a social justice issue, and over 60 organizations have participated. The d'var tikkun and follow-up emails from TLS include ways for participants to get involved with the organization's efforts.
