= Ethan Tucker =

Co-founder of Yeshivat Hadar

Ethan Tucker (born December 1, 1975) is an American rabbi, and is co-founder and rosh yeshiva (rabbinic dean) of Yeshivat Hadar in Manhattan.

== Early life and education ==
Tucker is the son of Rabbi Gordon Tucker and Hadassah Lieberman, and the stepson of the late former U.S. Senator Joe Lieberman. He earned a BA from Harvard College and a doctorate from the Jewish Theological Seminary of America.

== Career ==
Tucker is considered an authority on Egalitarianism in Jewish law. He is the co-author, with Rabbi Micha'el Rosenberg, of Gender Equality and Prayer in Jewish Law (2016). Tucker is also the co-host, with Hadar colleague Rabbi Avi Killip, of the podcast, Responsa Radio, produced by Jewish Public Media.

== See also ==
- Shai Held
- Elie Kaunfer
