= Mishkan Chicago =

Progressive Jewish congregation in Chicago, Illinois, US

- Location of administrative office in Chicago, Illinois

Religion
- Affiliation: Judaism
- Rite: (Progressive Judaism)
- Ecclesiastical or organisational status: Congregation
- Governing body: Jewish Emergent Network (past member)
- Leadership: Rabbi Lizzi Heydemann
- Status: Active

Location
- Location: 4001 North Ravenswood, Chicago, Illinois 60613 (Administrative offices)
- Country: United States
- Coordinates: 41°57′16″N 87°40′24″W

Architecture
- Founder: Rabbi Lizzi Heydemann
- Established: 2011 (as a congregation)

Website
- mishkanchicago.org

Mishkan Chicago is a Progressive Jewish congregation, located in Chicago, Illinois, in the United States. The congregation was founded in 2011 by Rabbi Lizzi Heydemann and was loosely modeled after IKAR in Los Angeles, where Heydemann served as a rabbinic intern. The congregation was a member of the Jewish Emergent Network.

== Overview ==
The congregation describes its mission as "lead(ing) people toward more purposeful, more connected, and more inspired lives." The organization creates "Jewish spaces to bring your whole self, and be part of something larger than yourself." It also engages in social justice efforts in the city of Chicago, including refugee resettlement and partnership with the Jewish Council on Urban Affairs.

Unlike a traditional synagogue, Mishkan Chicago does not have a fixed worship space, and uses multiple locations throughout the Chicago area.

The community serves over 5,000 people each year, including over 1,400 for annual High Holiday services.

Mishkan also provides holistic mental health services, including support groups, through Maggie's Place. Launched in 2017, Mishkan received a grant through the Jewish United Fund to support their work in this field.

During the COVID-19 pandemic, Mishkan transitioned its services to a wholly-online format using Zoom and held High Holiday services using a mix of asynchronously recorded video, live video, and socially distanced events.
