= JCC Maccabi Youth Games =

The JCC Maccabi Games is an Olympic style event held annually for Jewish youth between the ages of 13 and 17, hosted by JCC Association of North America. It is the largest Jewish youth sporting event in the world. Each summer, approximately 3,000 Jewish teen athletes from over 75 communities around the world convene for a week of individual and team athletic competition in one of several host communities in North America. The games were first held in 1982 in Memphis, Tennessee, with sponsorship by the Memphis Jewish Community Center. More than 500,000 athletes from around the globe have participated in the Games' over 40 year history. The JCC Maccabi Games' aim is to foster Jewish identity while developing national interest in Olympic sport through the Jewish Community Center's affiliation with the United States Olympic Committee.

JCC Maccabi works in partnership with Maccabi World Union, Maccabi Canada and Maccabi USA to create a global experience that provides a springboard for local JCCs to create year-round engagement.

Generally the Maccabiah Games are held once every 4 years in the summer in Israel. Due to the war with Iran, the Maccabiah 2025 was postponed to summer 2026. and will take place from June 30 to July 14, 2026,

There are 14 competitive sports contested each year including:

- Baseball
- In-line hockey
- Volleyball
- Soccer
- Basketball
- Swimming
- Tennis
- Table tennis
- Dance
- Golf
- Track & field
- Lacrosse

== Locations held ==
- 1982: Memphis
- 1984: Detroit
- 1985: Columbus
- 1986: Toronto (Canada)
- 1987: Cleveland, North Miami Beach
- 1988: Chicago
- 1989: Pittsburgh
- 1990: Detroit
- 1991: Cleveland, Omaha, Wayne, NJ
- 1992: Baltimore
- 1993: Boston, Pittsburgh, Sarasota, St. Louis
- 1994: Cleveland
- 1995: Columbus, Houston, Long Island, Los Angeles, Orlando
- 1996: MetroWest, NJ; St. Louis
- 1997: Hartford, Kansas City, Milwaukee, Pittsburgh, Sarasota, Seattle
- 1998: Charlotte, Detroit
- 1999: Cherry Hill, Columbus, Houston, Rochester
- 2000: Boca Raton, Cincinnati, Richmond, Staten Island,Tucson
- 2001: Atlanta, Miami, Monmouth, Philadelphia, Sarasota
- 2002: Baltimore, Montreal, Omaha, Springfield
- 2003: Houston, St. Louis, Tenafly
- 2004: Austin, Boston, Columbus; Greater Washington, MD
- 2005: Dallas, Richmond, San Antonio; St. Paul, MN
- 2006: Baltimore; Greater Phoenix, AZ; Stamford; Vancouver, BC
- 2007: Baltimore, Boca Raton; Deal, NJ; Orange County
- 2008: Akron, Detroit, Minneapolis, Northern Virginia, San Diego
- 2009: New Orleans, Orange County, San Francisco, San Antonio; Westchester County, NY(USA)
- 2010: Baltimore, Denver, Omaha, Richmond, San Rafael
- 2011: Springfield, Philadelphia, Israel
- 2012: Houston, Rockland, Memphis
- 2013: Austin, Orange County
- 2014: Cherry Hill, Boca Raton, Detroit
- 2015: Milwaukee, Dallas, Fort Lauderdale
- 2016: Columbus, St. Louis, Stamford
- 2017: Birmingham, Albany/Schenectady, Miami
- 2018: Orange County/Long Beach
- 2019: Atlanta, Detroit
- 2022: San Diego
- 2023: Israel, Fort Lauderdale
- 2024: Detroit, Houston
- 2025: Tucson, Pittsburgh
- 2026: Toronto, Kansas City
