= Independent minyan =

Lay-led Jewish worship and study community

An independent minyan is a lay-led Jewish worship and study community that has developed independently of established denominational and synagogue structures within the organized Jewish community. Some began in the late 1990s and most since the year 2000, though some are several decades older. These new groups often combine a commitment to halakha/Jewish law with egalitarianism, and strive to create worship services where traditional prayer can become "spiritual experiences".

Minyan (מנין) is the prayer quorum traditionally required for a full Jewish prayer service.

== Nomenclature ==
Some sources refer to the "independent minyan movement", drawing a parallel between the increasing number of independent minyanim and the past creation of established Jewish denominations (known as "movements"). Others reject the "movement" terminology and refer instead to the "independent minyan phenomenon" or simply to "independent minyanim" without a collective noun, because independent minyanim are not affiliated with a set of central organizations, and do not share a religious ideology.

Others still refer to the "independent minyan movement", understanding "movement" not in the sense of Jewish religious movements, but in the sense of social movements (such as the civil rights movement, or more closely parallel, the havurah movement); or a community/cultural movement, such as the Jewish Community Center movement. Others reject this sense of "movement" as well, because the connotation of "movement" among some members of the American Jewish community is too strongly related to its use regarding "denominations" (a fact that has led to confusion in the case of the havurah movement), and because independent minyanim arise for a number of different reasons, so that not all can be attributed to the same "movement".

Some (see "2007 Spiritual Communities Study", below) have argued for incorporating the independent minyan model as a subcategory of a broader "Jewish Emergent" phenomenon (named after a parallel movement in the Christian church). "Jewish emergent" encompasses both the independent minyan movement and so-called "rabbi-led emergent" communities, such as IKAR and Kavana.

== Independent minyan phenomenon ==
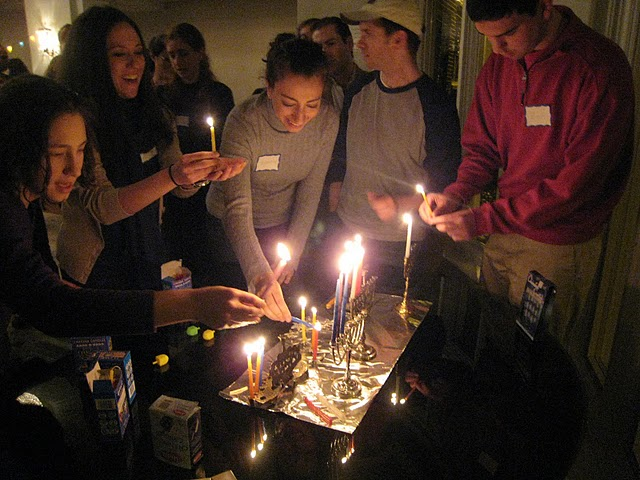
Members of the DC Minyan light candles in celebration of the Festival of Hanukkah.

Scholars of religion are looking very closely at the development of these lay-led congregations, most of which are held in locations other than synagogues, although some use synagogue space while maintaining separate leadership and organizational structures. Some synagogue and Jewish community leaders take a negative position on this development, seeing the new groups as a threat to conventional synagogue and Jewish community organization.

On the other hand, there are those who view the trend as extremely positive, and one that will ultimately lead to new approaches to religion and spirituality within the modern Jewish community: a "triumphant story of day-school education and egalitarianism." Jack Wertheimer, a Professor of Jewish History at the Jewish Theological Seminary of America has written that:

For some who take a longer view, the independent minyanim seem reminiscent of the Havurah movement of the 1970s, when numbers of young American Jews rejected the suburban synagogues of their parents in favor of small-group gatherings for study, prayer, and community. Commenting on the parallels between then and now, the scholar Riv-Ellen Prell has also underscored the differences. One salient difference is today's higher level of Jewish and Hebrew fluency, itself a testament to the organized community's investment in intensive Jewish education over the past two decades. The historical moment is also different; members of today's independent minyanim are not counter-cultural types in rebellion against their parents or committed to smashing existing institutions but a generation that is at once self-sufficient and open to compromise. An example of the newer spirit is the DC Minyan's commitment to separate seating, an infringement on the principle of strict sexual egalitarianism that is maintained for the sake of accommodating the group's diverse population. In the present moment, pluralism is valued over purity.

== Characteristics ==
In 2009, Rabbi Elie Kaunfer, executive director of Mechon Hadar and a rosh yeshiva (Rabbinic dean) of Yeshivat Hadar, defined the "independent minyan" as a congregation meeting three requirements: (1) volunteer-led and organized with no paid clergy; (2) no denomination/movement affiliation; and (3) founded in the previous 10 years. Kaunfer adds the goal of "spiritual prayer" to this list, noting that he himself often experienced worship services more as a "community experience" than as a "spiritual one".

Kaunfer notes that Kehilat Hadar began in New York as a result of a number of young Jews who were "looking for new ways to connect to the substance of their religion and tradition"—but instead of becoming "just a local minyan", "it became a model of grassroots religious community that spread dramatically across the United States and Israel. That model of community came to be known as an "independent minyan". An article on Kol Zimrah, another independent minyan on New York's Upper West Side, called many of the new independent minyans "part of what some have called a Jewish spiritual renaissance, with its emphasis on personal spirituality and connection with the divine."

Kaunfer emphasizes that the word "independent" means that many of these groups developed independently in terms of volunteers coming together to create and lead it, but—in agreement with Wertheimer's assessment of these minyanim—they are not nor do they seek to be independent of the larger Jewish community in terms of their vision or self-identity. "Quite the contrary," he says, "they see themselves filling a need not being met by existing institutions, but operating within the larger Jewish map, not outside or against it."

In his view, the phenomenon represented by the increasingly large number of independent minyans (Hebrew: minyanim) on both the national and international scene carries an important message for Jewish community leaders:

Among American Jews, there is a significant demand for meaningful, engaged Jewish life. There is a temptation to assume that Jews – especially young adults – are only interested in surface level engagement with Jewish culture: jokes, bagels, singles events. Anything challenging, deep or smacking of religion might scare people away. This is simply not the case. Jews are in search of meaning and engagement, and they are interested in the wisdom of their own heritage. They may not find that engagement in existing institutions, but that does not mean they aren't looking for it. They are looking for more than a class; they want to build real community. They want substance, and they want the skills to own their Jewish lives.

Experts like Jonathan Sarna, professor of American Jewish history at Brandeis University, agree, noting that the values that participants are bringing to these groups can add a new vision to the community:

It is an interesting mix between the egalitarian, pluralistic, inclusive values coming from the left and the values of learning and of observance coming from the right. They are making a new synthesis of these traditional and modern values that we haven't seen before.

Ari Kelman, a professor of American studies at the University of California at Davis, predicts that, "They are going to have a huge impact, because we are living in a moment where denominations are really not very successful, particularly with these 20- and 30-somethings."

=== 2007 Spiritual Communities Study ===
In 2007, Hebrew Union College sociologist Steven Cohen conducted a survey on behalf of the S3K Synagogue Studies Institute and Mechon Hadar. Based on 1354 responses to an online questionnaire, the study, co-authored by Shawn Landres, Elie Kaunfer, and Michelle Shain, found that social networking, not institutional structures, was the primary way that information about independent minyans spread. Additional findings included the fact that participants that the majority of participants had some day school education, or experience in Jewish summer camps, or college organizations like Hillel; 40% grew up in the Conservative movement; most were unmarried, and under 40; one third were male, and two thirds female; and most were "comfortable in Hebrew". More than half of the respondents had spent more than four months in Israel. Additionally, most attended services at least once a month, and two thirds prayed with more than one congregation.

In terms of affiliation with one of the religious movements within Judaism, the study found that:

Many minyan participants raised Orthodox or Conservative still identify as such, even if the minyan itself is not institutionally affiliated. But virtually all of those who were raised Reform no longer identify with that religious stream: Less than 3% of those involved with independent minyanim consider themselves Reform Jews.

While the study's findings are subject to interpretation, it is clear that the majority of participants in independent minyanim have benefited from the institutions and programs of the organized Jewish community, but are now seeking to add something new:

You can see the growth of independent minyanim as proof of the failure, or of the success, of the established U.S. Jewish community's efforts to keep the next generation involved. Those efforts include the expansion of Jewish day schools, of the on-campus Hillel movement for Jewish students, and of programs in Israel for young Jews. Independent minyan members, much more than other American Jews, are alumni of all these programs. The 2007 study showed that over half had spent four months or more in Israel for a single visit—far above the proportion for the wider Jewish community. Yet they haven't found their place in the established synagogues. They're likely to say they are "nondenominational"—a term usually, and mistakenly, taken as meaning that someone is drifting away from Judaism. Instead, they've created a traditional Judaism with an anarchic accent, in which participants expect rabbis to teach them but not to lead their services or be religious in their place.

It is also clear that participants in the minyans support the idea of Jewish community, in the United States and abroad, but think for themselves. So, for example, the study showed that the majority felt "very emotionally attached to Israel", but only the minority answered yes to the question of whether they are "always" proud of Israel.

== Tradition and egalitarianism ==
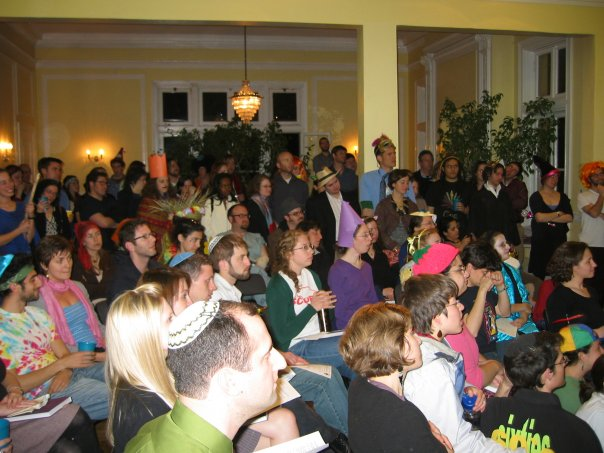
Members of independent minyan Tikkun Leil Shabbat celebrate the Jewish holiday of Purim.

Many independent minyanim seek approaches within traditional Jewish law as foundation for egalitarianism, and an expanded role of women both in the worship service and in the leadership structure. Jerusalem's Kehilat Shira Hadasha is credited as being the first Jewish congregation to implement an opinion by Modern Orthodox Rabbi Mendel Shapiro, whose "Qeri’at ha-Torah by Women: A Halakhic Analysis", cites and explains some precedents for allowing women to read from the Torah. (Some minyanim, like the Leader Minyan, also in Jerusalem, had a similar practice since the 1990s, before Rabbi Shapiro's opinion was released.)

Another Modern Orthodox rabbi whose writings are frequently cited by minyanim like Shira Hadasha is Daniel Sperber. Like Shapiro, Sperber argues in "Congregational Dignity and Human Dignity: Women and Public Torah Reading" that many past opinions recognized that there was religious legal support for the increased participation of women, but that this participation was not allowed because it was considered in societal/sociological terms to be an "affront to the congregation" (Hebrew: kevod ha-tsibur). Based on changes in society—at least within the context of the communities that make up some specific minyanim—rabbis like Shapiro and Sperber support such participation as no longer being an affront to the participants. Furthermore, Sperber argues that human dignity (Hebrew: kevod ha beriyot) should be recognized as the value that should drive changes in the participation of women in services.

While the positions of rabbis like Shapiro and Sperber have been criticized by some others, Shapiro responds that, "Among Jews there have been disputes throughout all the generations." Shapiro, who himself prays at Shira Hadasha, adds, "This is a synagogue where the congregants are people who are interested in religious development. We don't want to harm anyone, and we don't want others to harm us."

In addition to its early use of opinions like those of Shapiro and Sperber, Shira Hadasha is also generally recognized as the first independent minyan to come up with the hybrid of tradition and egalitarianism that adds to the prayer quorum requirement of ten men the additional requirement of ten women. Today, many other independent minyanim follow this approach as well. For example, the Australian congregation Shira Melbourne notes on its website that it is "modeled on the Shira Hadasha community in Jerusalem." One Los Angeles minyan, which also notes that it is "modeled after Shira Hadasha in Jerusalem", takes its name from this practice, calling itself the "Ten and Ten Minyan". Some other minyanim, like MigdalOr, admit that they "struggle" with the concept, but sometimes find it impractical to implement.

Although independent minyanim indeed operate independently and share no formal "movement" structure, there are strong informal links between these communities in different cities. Thus, many groups cite others as models, learning from and even modeling themselves after others:

The founders of these independent minyans have all learned from one another. Indeed, most know each other through networks such as the Dorot Fellowship’s alumni organization and have shared ideas and inspiration. D.C. Minyan founder Jessica Lieberman explicitly took Hadar as a model. Tiferet founder Evan Hochberg said he and his co-founders "were inspired by Darchei Noam and by Shira Hadasha in Jerusalem. We wanted to create a safe space for people to be Orthodox and feminist at the same time."

Ultimately, the leaders of many of these groups see the commitment to tradition on the one hand, and to egalitarianism (or feminism) on the other, as the "core values" of the vision that gives their communities foundation—although individual participants and individual congregations take different positions on exactly "how these values should intersect". For example, the website for Minyan Na'aleh in Denver, Colorado, explains:

At Minyan Na'aleh, you can expect a traditional and complete davening that is conducted mainly in Hebrew. We are completely lay-led and have no official Rabbi or affiliation with a particular movement. Our Friday night service is completely egalitarian, with men and women seated together, while Shabbat morning and some of our other services (Shavuot and Kol Nidrei) are conducted in an Orthodox egalitarian style (women lead some, but not all, parts of the service and seating is separated by gender). Why do we conduct services differently at different times? Because adherence to tradition and egalitarianism are core values for us, and because members of our community have differing opinions about how these values should intersect.

An article about Minyan Shivyoni, in the Baka area of Jerusalem, describes how the resolution of these "differing opinions" often results in a process of struggle among participants that is not easy, but the goal is "communal consensus":

As the Minyan Shivyoni navigates the process of becoming more egalitarian, each decision begins with open communal learning on the topic of discussion. From that point, there is an e-mail follow-up, disseminating the traditional sources discussed, which lead to more ideological and value-driven missives. Then, there is a vote. "There is a shared culture and atmosphere, even though there are great gaps between the different people in the minyan," [Co-founder Yair] Furstenburg said. "People give different weight to different elements—values, custom, traditional legal texts, atmosphere."

One new term being used to describe the synthesis of traditional Jewish law and equal participation by men and women is "halakhic egalitarian".

In addition to "core values" such as halakha and egalitarianism, some congregations, like Darchei Noam in Modiin, Israel, add a "commitment to social justice", as well—a concept that many participants believe includes egalitarianism, but is not limited to it.

== The Minyan Project ==
Within the overall rubric of the independent minyan phenomenon described by experts like Wertheimer, Kaunfer, Sarna, Kelman, and others who are studying it, many independent minyanim work as active participants in The Minyan Project, an international effort to support lay-led congregations, under the leadership of New York's Mechon Hadar, an institution that developed as a result of the growth of Kehilat Hadar.

It is "designed to empower vibrant prayer communities", offering one-on-one consulting, including resources and strategic planning advice, to leaders of groups around the county. In addition, it offers both on-line and traditional classes and courses. In November 2008, it facilitated a three-day leadership conference for over 90 representatives from 32 communities to create a system of networking and mutual support, in an effort to share best practices, lessons learned, and define ongoing and upcoming issues. It also held a one-day public forum at Brandeis University that attracted 120 representatives from conventional Jewish institutions, and included a keynote address in addition to eight panel discussions, involving scholars, Jewish professionals, and community worship leaders. Mechon Hadar organized another conference in April 2010 which included sessions on such issues as "Building a Singing Community", "expanding the concept" of egalitarianism, the "theory and practice" of pluralism, "empowering" existing communities, and the challenges and rewards of holding simultaneous multiple worship services within a synagogue setting.

As part of this ongoing effort, the Minyan Project has developed a "Halakhic Think Tank" to provide a forum for discussion and guidance on "crucial halakhic issues facing ... burgeoning communities, including gender, kashrut, defining relationships and boundaries with the non-Jewish world ... [and] navigating different levels of observance with the Jewish community."

== Partnership minyanim ==
While many independent minyanim do not identify with any one of the Jewish religious movements, Partnership minyan is a term being used by the Jewish Orthodox Feminist Alliance (JOFA) to describe those that seek to expand the leadership role of women while still identifying themselves as part of the Modern Orthodox community, within the overall rubric of Orthodox Judaism.

In 2008, members of JOFA approached two PhD candidates in New England who were working as consultants to a number of minyanim, with the recommendation that a guide be created to help groups such as Partnership minyanim. In 2008, the "Guide for the 'Halakhic Minyan'" was published. The guide is meant to help minyanim seeking halakhic justification for expansion of women in leadership roles in different areas of the service and in different ways, whether or not complete egalitarianism, equal roles, is part of the minyan's self-described vision or goals: "While many ... minyanim aim to extend participation to women as far as Halacha permits, they are by no means egalitarian - hence the phrase 'halachic minyan' in the title of the guide, and not 'egalitarian minyan.'"
