= Hadar (educational institution) =

Jewish institution in New York City

Coordinates: 40.776575°N 73.983417°W

Hadar is an educational institution on the Upper West Side of Manhattan. The institute offers various programs to support the development of Judaism that is both traditional and egalitarian. A major component of the institute is Yeshivat Hadar, which offers both summer and year-long fellowships for students to learn full-time in the yeshiva setting. Prominent rabbis associated with Yeshivat Hadar include co-founders Shai Held, Elie Kaunfer, and Ethan Tucker.

Yeshivat Hadar announced in February 2019 that it would ordain rabbis. Its main objective is to train lay leaders rather than rabbis.

== History ==
Founded in 2006 by Rabbis Shai Held, Elie Kaunfer, and Ethan Tucker as an institution for intense Torah study and as an advisory for congregations and minyanim looking to reinvigorate their prayer services, Hadar has since grown to include a unique array of offerings that reflect the true splendor—hadar in Hebrew—of Judaism. Hadar offers summer and year-long fellowship programs for young Jews wanting to expand their knowledge of Torah; it teaches core Jewish values, Jewish ideas, and communal music (Rising Song Institute with Joey Weisenberg) through three centers for learning; and it offers short-term seminars for Jewish leaders of all stripes, from teachers to rabbis (rabbinic yeshiva intensive) to Hillel professionals (Jewish Professionals Institute) to lay people who want to make a difference in their own communities (Executive Seminar). In March 2017, Hadar celebrated its first 10 years with a year-long, weekly podcast on Pirkei Avot, a siyyum on Seder Nezikin, and a national shabbaton that drew more than 500 attendees.

In July 2023 Hadar announced the ordination of eight rabbis.

== Fellowships ==
Yeshivat Hadar offers year-long and summer fellowships for full time study. Mornings are devoted to Talmud and afternoon courses typically cover topics such as halakha, midrash, maḥshava, and tefilla. In addition to learning Torah, fellowships include communal prayer, service, and community building activities.

== Work with independent minyanim ==
Yeshivat Hadar's leadership assists congregations in reviving their services and invigorating independent prayer. Groups wishing to found or re-energize their own prayer communities have turned to Rabbi Kaunfer's book Empowered Judaism. Joey Weisenberg, a Yeshivat Hadar faculty member also wrote a book for independent minyanim, Building Singing Communities. Mechon Hadar's website contains information and resources to help independent leaders enhance services. Yeshivat Hadar has a longstanding relationship with Kehillat Hadar, an egalitarian prayer community on Upper West Side of Manhattan, though they operate as separate institutions.
