= Kavana Cooperative =

Jewish community in Seattle, Washington, US

The Kavana Cooperative
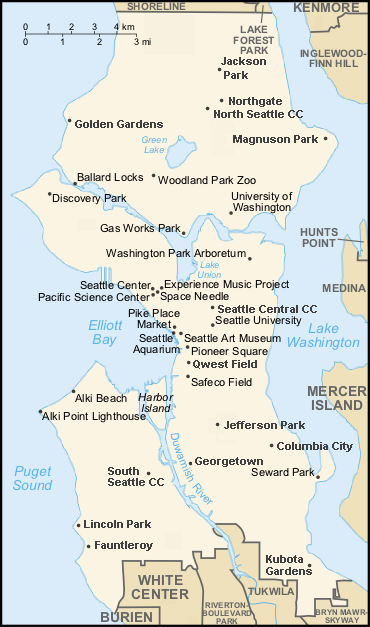
- Location in Seattle, Washington

Religion
- Affiliation: Judaism
- Rite: Non-denominational Judaism
- Ecclesiastical or organizational status: Congregation
- Leadership: Rabbi Rachel Nussbaum; Rabbi Jay LeVine
- Status: Active

Location
- Location: Queen Anne, Seattle, Washington (administration office)
- Country: United States
- Interactive map of The Kavana Cooperative
- Coordinates: 47°38′22″N 122°21′39″W

Architecture
- Established: 2006 (as a congregation)

Website
- kavana.org

The Kavana Cooperative (transliterated from Hebrew as "intention"; pronounced "Kah-va-NAH") is a non-denominational Jewish congregation located in Seattle, Washington, in the United States. Formed in 2006, the pluralistic community is based on a cooperative model, where partners and participants take on the responsibility for actively creating a Jewish life for the group. It hosts educational, religious, and social programs for adults and families.

Rabbi Rachel Nussbaum is the organization's spiritual leader. The congregation's administration office is located in the Queen Anne neighborhood of Seattle.

== Awards ==
The cooperative received the Levitan Innovation Award in 2006. In 2007, Kavana received a grant for a social justice program, and was named one of North America's most innovative nonprofit organizations in Slingshot '07-'08, a guidebook published by the Andrea and Charles Bronfman Philanthropies. Additionally, Kavana received a 2007-2008 grant from the Legacy Heritage Fund for its "Prep and Practice" program. In 2009, Kavana was named one of the Top 25 Most Vibrant Congregations by Newsweek.

Newsweek named Nussbaum one of the Top 25 Pulpit Rabbis in America in 2008. Nussbaum was again named one of America's Top 50 Most Influential Rabbis by Newsweek and Daily Beast in 2011.

== See also ==
- Independent minyan
- Chavurah
