= Tony Jones (theologian) =

American theologian & author

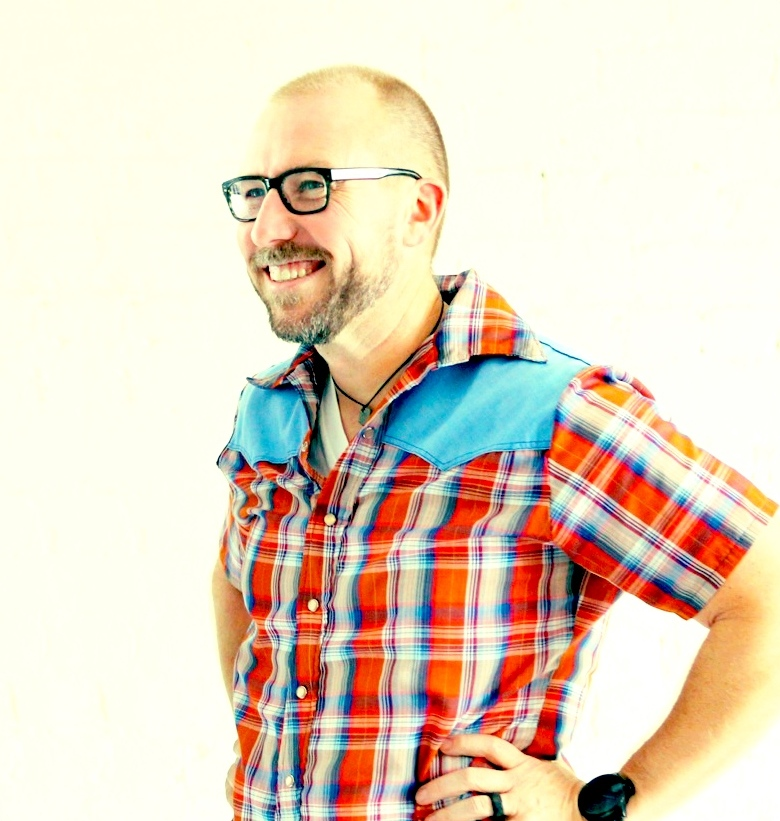
- Jones in December 2012
- Education: Dartmouth College
- Occupations: Author; religious leader
- Spouses: Julie McMahon (div. 2009); Courtney Perry (m. 2013)

Tony Jones is a leader in the Christian emerging church movement, a theologian, and an author.

== Personal life ==
Jones grew up near Edina, Minnesota, and graduated from Edina High School in 1990. He later graduated from Dartmouth College and attended both Fuller Theological Seminary and Princeton University, pursuing a doctorate at the latter. Jones divorced his first wife, Julie McMahon, in 2009. In July 2011, Jones married Courtney Perry in a religious ceremony, but one that was not legally recognised by the laws of Minnesota, or the United States, in solidarity with non-heterosexual couples who could not wed: "It was for this reason that Courtney and I decided to forego legal marriage until such time as our GLBT friends were afforded all of the benefits that accrue with a legal marriage." Twenty-eight months later, they were scheduled to legally wed at the Minneapolis Sculpture Garden on November 11, 2013.

== Career ==
While attending Fuller Theological, Jones returned to his childhood church, Colonial Church in Edina. He worked there as a youth pastor for seven years before leaving for his doctoral work at Princeton. As a spokesperson with the emerging church movement, Jones was invited by a similar Jewish organization, Synagogue 3000, to speak at their 2006 meeting. On October 31, 2008, Jones' leadership position in the emerging-church organization Emergent Village was eliminated. Jones began attending Solomon's Porch in 2005, a church in South Minneapolis, and by April 2012, he was the group's "theologian-in-residence" and helped run workshops about connecting with congregants with 21st-century means. At the same time, Jones was an adjunct professor with Fuller.

In 2006, Jones was a contributor to Christianity Today magazine. Jones is the author of the non-fiction book, The New Christians (2008). Religion Dispatches' Peter Laarman was pleasantly surprised by Jones' 2012 non-fiction book A Better Atonement; Laarman called Jones a celebrity in the emerging church movement, and recommended the book for "anyone who’s even considering whether 'that old-time religion' isn't quite good enough any more." Jones also turned his doctoral dissertation into a book, The Church Is Flat, about the emerging church movement. In 2020, Associated Press Sports Editors named a Star Tribune publication co-authored by Jones, "Odyssey ahead in the BWCA", as the organization's number-one sports "project" of 2019.

In 2012, Jones published the controversial mobile app Ordain Thyself, which offers a variety of religions in which the user can virtually ordain themselves. The app has options for Catholicism, Hasidic Judaism, Hinduism, and Klingon religions, each of which instructs the user on their new belief system and provides photo filters to apply the appropriate vestments to personal photos. Ordain Thyself retailed for US$0.99 (equivalent to $1.39 in 2025).

== Publications ==
- The New Christians: Dispatches from the Emergent Frontier. Minneapolis: Fortress Press. 2008. ISBN 978-1-5064-5495-5.
- The Church Is Flat: The Relational Ecclesiology of the Emerging Church Movement. The JoPa Group. 2011. ISBN 9780615524313.
- A Better Atonement: Beyond the Depraved Doctrine of Original Sin (Kindle). Minneapolis: The JoPa Group. 2012.
- With Timmons, Bob; Lavinsky, Aaron (July 12, 2019). "Odyssey ahead in the BWCA". Star Tribune. OCLC 43369847. Archived from the original on September 19, 2020.
