= 2026 European infrastructure disruption =

Bomb hoaxes and cyberattacks in Europe

- A Swiss Air Force fighter jet. Fighter jets were used to intercept planes with reported threats.
- Location: Various countries across Europe
- Date: October–November 2026
- Target: Planes, airports, schools, supermarkets, media organisations
- Attack type: Hoax; Bomb threat Hacking
- Perpetrators: Various, unknown
- Motive: Unknown

Between October and November 2026, a series of bomb threats and cyberattacks were reported around Europe causing severe disruption in various countries and settings. As of November 2026, no proven connection has been made between the events.

== Events ==
=== Aviation ===
On 2 November, a bomb threat was received on a Wizz Air flight from London to Sofia, and the aircraft had to be diverted to Budapest. A further seven threats were received the following day with LOT, Ryanair and SAS flights among affected.

Between 5 November and 6 November, aircraft were targeted again with at least 27 reports around Europe, with flights in Ireland, the United Kingdom, France, Belgium, Portugal, Spain, Italy, Austria, the Czech Republic, Poland, Denmark, Finland, Serbia, Romania, Bulgaria and Greece affected.

=== Media organisations ===
In Ireland, the RTÉ studios were evacuated after a threat was reported there on 6 October 2026. Newstalk, Virgin Media and Irish Independent also received the threat.

In Bulgaria, Nova TV received an emailed threat the same day. Its Sofia newsroom was evacuated and searched.

Sky News in the UK also received a similar threat and notified the authorities.

=== Schools ===
Between 14 October and 19 October 2026, more than 450 schools received hoax emails warning of an explosive device inside the school, across the United Kingdom and Republic of Ireland. As a result, many schools were shut down. The messages were made to appear to come from Islamic terrorist organisations and were signed with "Allahu Akbar".

The emails are suspected to have come from outside the United Kingdom.

On 11 November 2026, thousands of schools across Italy, Scotland, Republic of Ireland, and Northern Ireland received anonymous hoax emails under the name of "Mikhail Andropov", warning of a bomb inside the school. As a result, many schools were evacuated across the three countries.

==== Arrests ====
An 18-year-old man was arrested for making hoax bomb threats through email to several buildings, including a secondary school, Bishop Stopford School in Kettering, Northamptonshire.

=== Supermarket refrigerator hack ===
On the night of 11 October 2026, an as yet unknown party hacked into the refrigeration controllers at up to 700 French supermarkets and set them to defrost mode overnight, causing their refrigerators to overheat. Over 300 Intermarché and Netto stores, 80 Coopérative U, 80 Carrefour stores, around 30 Monoprix stores, several E.Leclerc stores, and others were struck in an large-scale cyberattack. The refrigeration controllers by Danfoss each ran a web server reachable over the public internet, many of them accessible using login credentials 'admin' as the username and the current date as the password. Hackers compromised the supermarkets' refrigeration systems which were instructed to enter an unusual defrost cycle with their contents still inside. The hack went unnoticed as it did not activate alarms and many employees were not present at the time to stop it. Refrigerators overheated due to the continuous defrosting, with many climbing up to 50°C (122°F) after six hours. A supermarket in Normandy reported some of its refrigerators had reached 80 °C (176 °F). Across France, whole aisles of refrigerated produce and frozen goods were ruined and forced supermarkets to discard vast stocks of spoiled goods due to food safety concerns. An Intermarché supermarket in Issy-les-Moulineaux alone disposed of several tons of products. Furthermore, at some supermarkets, the intense heat caused refrigeration equipment to melt or even catch fire; water damage from fire sprinkler systems also occurred. BFM TV initially reported that some locations could face losses in the tens of thousands; two outlets in Alsace alone reported a combined loss of €270,000. The total damage was estimated to have been tens of millions of euros. The same day various disruptions in the groceries sector also occurred in neighboring Netherlands and Belgium.

Map of countries affected by the supermarket attacks

On 2 November 2026, a second attack on refrigeration and freezer systems occurred, hitting over 115 supermarkets across various countries in Europe. In Ireland, 13 SuperValu stores were impacted. Belgium was one of the most heavily affected countries. Approximitely 15 Carrefour stores, 15 Intermarchés and 5 SPARs were affected. Dozens of Ahold Delhaize locations were affected in Belgium and well as in Luxembourg. In Sweden, ICA, one of the main targets in the country, confirmed that Danfoss controllers were likely the reason for the attack. Over 20 ICA locations were affected while another retailer, Coop, reported 7 incidents. In the Netherlands, at least 17 local shops and food businesses reported attacks. In Italy, among affected were four Coop stores in Sicily. Seven Intermarché supermarkets were hit in Portugal. In Estonia, at least one supermarket reported abnormal temperature settings on refrigerators. In Finland, the Kesko group investigated irregular refrigerator activity in a few smaller grocery stores belonging to the company. In Germany, among affected supermarkets were Edeka and CAP Markets. In Romania, a possible cyberattack affecting six shops belonging to the same retail chain was reported. In the UK a number of food production businesses reported incidents. Poland also reported an attack, although the target has not been publicly identified..

== See also ==
- 2024 Indian bomb hoaxes
- 2016 Australian school bomb threats
- 2005 Brisbane bomb hoax
- 2018 Bitcoin bomb threats
- 2026 Binance hack
- Cyberattacks against infrastructure
- List of cyberattacks
- November 2026 technology outages
