= 2026 European bomb threat wave =

Series of bomb hoaxes in October-November 2026

- A Swiss Air Force fighter jet. Fighter jets were used to intercept planes with reported threats.
- Date: October–November 2026
- Location: Various countries across Europe
- Type: Hoax; Bomb threat
- Motive: Unknown
- Target: Planes, airports, schools, media organisations
- Perpetrators: Various, unknown
- Outcome: Flight diversions, security searches and evacuations
- Methods: Threats including emails

The 2026 European bomb threat wave was a series of bomb threats around Europe causing severe disruption in various countries and settings, occurring between October and November 2026. Over this time period there have been more than 8 000 reports of incidents across the whole continent.

Among affected were passenger flights, media organisations and schools. The alerts led to aircraft diversions, security searches and evacuations. Authorities treated many of the threats as hoaxes.

As of 11 November, responsibility for the threats had not been publicly established, and it remained unclear whether the incidents shared a common source. European officials coordinated information-sharing on aviation security, while national authorities investigated the threats.

== Background ==
The threats occurred amid wider concern over disruption to European infrastructure, including cyberattacks on supermarket refrigeration systems and other incidents. European officials had warned of hybrid threats, but the occurrence of these incidents in the same period did not itself establish a connection between them.

In Spain, the wave was triggered by an actual bomb attack on 10 November in Oviedo that killed a police officer and seriously injured another one, leading to a mass panic across the country and multiple bomb threats being made. Because of the attacker's profile, police considered that the attack in Oviedo was not terrorism-motivated.

== Events ==
=== Aviation ===
On 2 November, a bomb threat was received on a Wizz Air flight from London to Sofia, and the aircraft had to be diverted to Budapest. A further seven threats were received the following day with LOT, Ryanair and SAS flights among affected.

Between 5 November and 6 November, aircraft were targeted again, leading to diversions, security searches and the deployment of military aircraft. There were at least 27 reports around Europe with flights in Ireland, the United Kingdom, France, Belgium, Portugal, Spain, Italy, Austria, the Czech Republic, Poland, Denmark, Finland, Serbia, Romania, Bulgaria and Greece affected.

An Aer Lingus flight from Dublin to Rome was diverted to Évreux air base in France on 5 November and escorted by French fighter jets. Bulgarian military aircraft escorted three airliners; a Ryanair flight from London to Sofia was diverted to Plovdiv. Further threats were reported on 6 November, including against flights arriving at and departing from Prague.

On 6 November, reports confirmed that no explosive devices had been found on threatened flights.

=== Media organisations ===
On 6 November, Ireland's public broadcaster RTÉ had to evactuate its studios in Donnybrook and suspend programming after receiving a threat. Newstalk, Virgin Media and Irish Independent also reported receiving the threat.

In Bulgaria, Nova TV received an emailed threat the same day. Its Sofia newsroom was evacuated and searched.

Sky News in the UK and TF1 in France also received similar threats and notified the authorities.

The sender's identity nor whether the messages came from the source of the aviation threats have not been established.

=== Schools ===
Between 14 October and 19 October 2026, more than 450 schools received hoax emails warning of an explosive device inside the school, across the United Kingdom and Republic of Ireland. As a result, many schools were shut down. In Northern Ireland, the PSNI estimated that around 300 schools had received the same message, while in Scotland, at least 33 schools were targeted, according to Mimecast. The messages carried the subject line “Death is near" and were made to appear to come from Islamic terrorist organisations, referring to "Shariah law" and were signed with "Allahu Akbar".

The emails are suspected to have come from outside the United Kingdom.

On 11 November 2026, thousands of schools across Italy, Scotland, Republic of Ireland, and Northern Ireland received anonymous hoax emails under the name of "Mikhail Andropov", warning of a bomb inside the school. As a result, many schools were evacuated across the three countries.

In Italy, approximately 6 300 schools received the bomb warning by email, prompting evacuations and closures. In Rome, students at occupied schools feared that the alerts could be used to clear their occupations. A representative of the Lazio principals' association said police had inspected occupied schools without tensions. After a meeting with the prefect, a student representative said the occupation of the Minghetti school in Bologna and others continued following inspections.

In the Republic of Ireland, around 300 schools reported threats, with a similar number affected in Northern Ireland.

In Scotland, roughly 1 000 schools were targeted according to the police, with many being evacuated as a precaution.

On 12 November, a further wave of emailed threats reached 3,778 schools across Italy, with 77 schools evacuated. Some schools were evacuated, while checks were conducted at others with pupils remaining in class. Agenzia Nazionale Stampa Associata reported that the new messages bore the same purported signature as those sent on 11 November, but that preliminary investigations indicated they had been sent from different email addresses. The government instructed schools not to evacuate automatically in response to such mass emails; under its circular, the local prefect would decide whether to evacuate when there were specific and well-founded grounds for alarm. More schools in Northern Ireland and Scotland also received bomb threats on the same day, as well as school districts in France.

Italian schools were targeted a third time on 16 November, hit over 100 Italian schools. Along with bomb hoaxes there were threats claiming cafeteria food was mixed with poisonous sodium azide and potassium cyanide. The emails were linked to a research centre in Da Nang, Vietnam, that was believed to have been hacked.

==== Arrests ====
Following the October wave, an 18-year-old man was arrested for making hoax bomb threats through email to several buildings, including a secondary school, Bishop Stopford School in Kettering, Northamptonshire.

== Perpentrators ==
As of 11 November 2026, authorities had not publicly assigned responsibility for the bomb hoaxes. Security specialists suggested possible explanations including coordinated disruption, individuals acting on personal grievances, and copycat threats.

Some messages invoked names associated with misogynistic groups. An email sent to airport contacts in Italy on 5 November claimed to come from "fighters of the Male State"; Reuters could not independently identify its sender. Vladislav Pozdnyakov, who founded the Russian anti-feminist movement Male State, denied the group's involvement. Messages received by Italian schools on 11 and 12 November were signed by a purported "Mikhail Andropov" from "Misogynistan". Reuters reported that the same purported author had claimed responsibility for threats sent to newsrooms. These claims did not establish the identity of those responsible.

== Reactions ==
Following the aviation threats, the European Commission activated an information-sharing mechanism and scheduled a meeting of aviation security experts from EU member states for 11 November. Norway, Switzerland and Iceland were also invited; the planned discussion concerned the incidents and possible coordination measures.

After media organisations received threats on 6 November, Irish Taoiseach Micheál Martin said that the Garda Síochána, Defence Forces and other authorities were working with European counterparts to identify those responsible. He said it had not been determined whether the threats came from individuals or a coordinated group. Tánaiste Simon Harris described threats against the media as a threat to democracy.

On 11 November, Italian prime minister Giorgia Meloni said that those sending the threats sought to generate fear and disruption. She said Italian law enforcement was working with European counterparts to identify their source. Later on she stated that checks had found no indication of a concrete danger and that police and public agencies were monitoring the situation. Antonello Giannelli, head of Italy's national school principals' association, said that even hoaxes caused distress to school communities and interrupted education.

== See also ==
- 2024 Indian bomb hoaxes
- 2016 Australian school bomb threats
- 2005 Brisbane bomb hoax
- 2018 Bitcoin bomb threats
- 2026 European cold chain hacks
