= Jewish Center =

Jewish Center may refer to synagogues and their associated community centers in the following locations:

== United States ==
=== California ===
- Pacific Jewish Center, an Orthodox synagogue in Venice

=== Ohio ===
- Akron Jewish Center, a registered historic building in Akron

=== New Jersey ===
- Freehold Jewish Center (Congregation Agudath Achim), a synagogue in Freehold
- Marlboro Jewish Center (Congregation Ohev Shalom), a Conservative synagogue in Marlboro

=== New York ===
- Mosholu Jewish Center, a former synagogue in Norwood, the Bronx
- Riverdale Jewish Center, an Orthodox synagogue in Riverdale, the Bronx
- Jewish Center of Coney Island, a synagogue in Brighton Beach, Brooklyn
- Beth El Jewish Center of Flatbush, a synagogue in Flatbush, Brooklyn
- Ocean Parkway Jewish Center, a synagogue in Kensington, Brooklyn
- Jewish Center of Kings Highway, Brooklyn
- Manhattan Beach Jewish Center, an Orthodox synagogue in Manhattan Beach, Brooklyn
- East Midwood Jewish Center, a Conservative synagogue in Midwood, Brooklyn
- Kingsway Jewish Center, a Modern Orthodox synagogue in Midwood, Brooklyn
- Park Slope Jewish Center (Congregation Tifereth Israel), a Conservative synagogue in Park Slope, Brooklyn
- East Meadow Beth-El Jewish Center, a Conservative synagogue in East Meadow
- Jericho Jewish Center, a Conservative synagogue in Jericho
- Jewish Center of Lake Huntington
- Jewish Center of the Hamptons, a synagogue in Long Island
- Fort Tryon Jewish Center, a synagogue in Manhattan
- West Side Jewish Center (Congregation Beth Israel), an Orthodox synagogue in the Garment District of Manhattan
- Jewish Center (Manhattan), an Orthodox synagogue on the Upper West Side of Manhattan
- Mount Sinai Jewish Center, an Orthodox synagogue in Washington Heights, Manhattan
- Jewish Center of Norwich
- Hollis Hills Jewish Center, a Conservative synagogue in Hollis Hills, Queens
- Queens Jewish Center, an Orthodox synagogue in Forest Hills, Queens
- Rego Park Jewish Center, a Conservative synagogue in Rego Park, Queens
- Lincoln Park Jewish Center, an Orthodox synagogue in Yonkers

=== Vermont ===
- Rutland Jewish Center, a synagogue in Rutland

== See also ==
- West Side Jewish Center (disambiguation)
- Jewish Community Center
