= Goulburn High School =

Location
- Goulburn, Southern Tablelands, New South Wales; Australia; 34°44′48″S 149°42′42″E

Information
- Former names: Goulburn Boys' High School; Goulburn Girls' High School
- Type: Government-funded co-educational comprehensive secondary day school
- Motto: Latin: Iustee et Tenaciter (Justice and Tenacity)
- Established: 1 October 1883; 142 years ago (as Goulburn Boys' School and as Goulburn Girls' High School)
- Educational authority: New South Wales Department of Education
- Principal: Yogesh Mani
- Teaching staff: 52.6 FTE (2018)
- Years: 7–12
- Enrolment: 591 (2018)
- Campus type: Regional
- Colours: Blue and yellow
- Website: goulburn-h.schools.nsw.gov.au

Goulburn High School is a government-funded co-educational comprehensive secondary day school, located in Goulburn, in the Southern Tablelands region of New South Wales, Australia.

Established in 1883 as Goulburn Boys' High School and as Goulburn Girls' High School, the school enrolled approximately 600 students in 2018, from Year 7 to Year 12, of whom seven percent identified as Indigenous Australians and six percent were from a language background other than English. The school is operated by the NSW Department of Education.

== 2016 Australian school bomb threats ==
On 11 February 2016, Goulburn High School was evacuated and surrounding streets closed after receiving an automated message indicating there was a bomb on the premises. Goulburn High School was among a number of Australian schools targeted with hoax bomb threats in early 2016.

== See also ==
- 2016 Australian school bomb threats
- List of government schools in New South Wales: G–P
- Education in Australia
