= West Side Jewish Center =

West Side Jewish Center may refer to:

- Jewish Center (Manhattan), an Orthodox synagogue on West 86th Street on Manhattan's Upper West Side
- Congregation Beth Israel West Side Jewish Center, an Orthodox synagogue on West 34th Street in Manhattan's Garment District

== See also ==
- Jewish Center (disambiguation)
- New West End Synagogue
