= Juan M. Thompson =

American journalist (1985–2024)

- Born: March 31, 1985; St. Louis, Missouri, U.S.
- Died: September 7, 2024 (aged 39); St. Louis, Missouri, U.S.
- Education: Vassar College
- Known for: Terminated from The Intercept due to fabrications of quotes and attributions in news articles; Convicted for Jewish Community Center bomb threats in 2017
- Status: Deceased
- Convictions: Cyberstalking (18 U.S.C. § 2261A); Making a false bomb threat (18 U.S.C. § 1038)
- Penalty: 5 years imprisonment

Juan M. Thompson (March 31, 1985 – September 7, 2024) was an American former journalist who was later convicted for cyberstalking and making several bomb threats to Jewish Community Centers in the U.S.

== Personal background ==
Thompson was a native of St. Louis, Missouri. He attended Vassar College in Poughkeepsie, New York, and was connected to the student newspaper. However, Thompson failed to graduate. He was a summer intern with DNAinfo Chicago and an intern for a WBEZ talk show for four months.

In November 2016, Thompson announced plans to run for mayor of St. Louis, but failed to raise money in an online campaign, only raising $25 from a single donation.

== Reporting scandal and termination from The Intercept ==
Thompson was a staff reporter for The Intercept, but was fired in February 2016 for fabricating quotes and attributions in news articles. This included a false claim, purportedly made by a cousin of Dylann Roof, that Roof was motivated to commit the Charleston church shooting because a former love interest chose black men over Roof. A note from editor Betsy Reed indicated that Thompson had been fired recently after his editors discovered "a pattern of deception" in his reporting. According to Reed, he had "fabricated several quotes in his stories and created fake email accounts that he used to impersonate people, one of which was a Gmail account in my name".

The site's investigation into Thompson's reporting had found that he had, on multiple occasions, attributed quotes to people who said he had not interviewed them or did not remember him doing so, people whom they could not reach to verify the quote or whose identity could not be confirmed. In the retracted story, Roof's family said they did not know of a cousin whom Thompson had quoted as saying Roof's interest in white supremacy took off after a woman to whom he was attracted began dating a black man. He also used "quotes that we cannot verify from unnamed people whom he claimed to have encountered at public events". To prevent his fabrications from being discovered, she continued, he lied to editors about how he had gotten the quotes, and in one case created an email account in the name of one of his sources. When editors discovered his actions, she added, he stood by his published work and, while admitting to creating the email accounts, refused to assist in the review otherwise.

In an email to Reed he shared with various news outlets, Thompson said he was being treated for testicular cancer and for that reason had not had access to his notes when the site had asked to review them. He explained his methods as "writing drafts of stories, placing the names of [people] I wanted to get quotes from in there, and then going to fetch the quotes ... If I couldn't obtain a quote from the person I wanted, I went somewhere else, and must've forgot to change the names—clearly." While he admitted this was "sloppy", he faulted The Intercept for lacking "a sustained and competent editor to guide me," alluding to the site's managerial turnovers. He also claimed that the greater problem was racism in the media field, that he made up pseudonyms for some of his sources because they were "poor black people who didn't want their names in the public given the situations" and who would not have spoken with a reporter otherwise, and that he had felt a need to "exaggerate my personal shit in order to prove my worth" at The Intercept given incidents of racial bias he said he had witnessed there. When Gawker published his email, Reed said those allegations had not been in the version he sent her.

After the note was published, the site amended Thompson's online biography when an editor at a Chicago public radio station said that while Thompson had indeed worked there, he had no involvement in the station's news reporting as he had claimed. His past tenure at DNAinfo in Chicago, where one editor tweeted in response to the story that she could have seen it coming, was also edited out.

He was fired by The Intercept in early 2016, and according to Reed, did not cooperate with the investigation of his actions.

== Post-termination ==
Following his termination from The Intercept, a reporter from The Riverfront Times documented Thompson's history of ethical breaches in his job. This reportedly prompted Thompson to harass the reporter. He first attempted to get him fired, then set up a series of fake social media accounts in which he claimed the reporter was a rapist. The accounts were later shut down by investigators.

On July 7, 2016, Thompson posted a 5,000-word essay in which he ranted against what he claimed to be "[t]he white New York media" and claimed The Intercept had launched a racist smear campaign against him. In 2017, he had been working as communications director for the Gateway Housing Foundation a small, St. Louis-based, non-profit organization dedicated to helping the homeless. The Gateway Housing Foundation released a statement that Thompson had only worked there a short time and was released prior to his making bomb threats against Jewish Community Centers.

=== Cyberstalking and bomb threats ===
In 2016, after Thompson's girlfriend broke up with him, he began harassing her, including threats of revenge porn, and making bomb threats to Jewish Community Centers as retaliation. According to officials, Thompson phoned in and emailed many of the threats under his ex-girlfriend's name in an effort to frame her. Thompson also made at least one threat under his own name, under the pretense that his ex-girlfriend was framing him. He had also emailed the Anti-Defamation League in his own name in late February 2017, pointing to his ex-girlfriend as the perpetrator of all of the bomb threats.

Thompson was arrested in March 2017 by the FBI in St. Louis for allegedly making bomb threats against at least eight Jewish community centers. He was also charged with one count of cyberstalking. He was extradited to New York and appeared in Manhattan federal court on March 29, where his public defender declined to seek bail.

On April 10, Thompson pleaded not guilty to the charge of cyberstalking. He was scheduled to reappear in court on May 18. On June 13, Thompson pleaded guilty to one count of cyberstalking and one count of sending bomb threats to Jewish community centers. In December 2017, he was sentenced to five years in prison. He was released from prison on December 28, 2023. In September 2024, he was found dead from a suspected drug overdose.
