= Ohel Moshe =

Ohel Moshe (Hebrew: אוהל משה, "Tent of Moses") may refer to:

- Ohel Moshe (former neighborhood in Tel Aviv)
- Ohel Moshe (neighborhood in Jerusalem), today part of Nachlaot
- Ohel Moshe Synagogue, today the Shanghai Jewish Refugees Museum
- Yeshiva Ohel Moshe is a school in Bensonhurst (Brooklyn, NY)
