= Brighton Synagogue =

Brighton Synagogue may refer to:

- Brighton and Hove Reform Synagogue
- Brighton and Hove Progressive Synagogue
- Brighton Regency Synagogue
- Jewish Center of Brighton Beach
- Middle Street Synagogue in Brighton, United Kingdom
