= Carol Mutch =

New Zealand professor of critical studies in education

- Born: 1953 (age 72–73); Greymouth
- Awards: McKenzie Award

Academic background
- Education: University of Canterbury, University of North London, Griffith University
- Thesis: Context, Complexity and Contestation in Curriculum Construction: Developing Social Studies in the New Zealand Curriculum (2004)

Carol Anne Mutch (born 1953) is a New Zealand academic, and is Professor of Critical Studies in Education at the University of Auckland, specialising in disaster management and recovery in educational settings, and the role of schools during crises.

== Academic career ==
Mutch comes from the West Coast of New Zealand, and is one of six children. Her father was a coal miner, and Mutch was aware of the 1967 Strongman mine disaster growing up.

Mutch completed a Bachelor's degree at the University of Canterbury in 1974, before beginning her career teaching in Canterbury and Otago primary schools. She then moved into teacher education at the Christchurch College of Education, and gained a master's degree in educational studies at the University of North London in 1994 and a PhD ten years later titled Context, Complexity and Contestation in Curriculum Construction: Developing Social Studies in the New Zealand Curriculum at Griffith University.

After the Christchurch College of Education was merged with the University of Canterbury in 2007, Mutch moved into a policy advisor role at the Education Review Office (ERO). Mutch then joined the faculty of the University of Auckland, rising to full professor in 2021. As of 2024 Mutch is the Education Commissioner for the New Zealand National Commission of UNESCO.

Mutch shared an office in the PGC Building in Christchurch through her work for ERO. The building collapsed, killing 18 people and injuring others, in the 22 February 2011 Christchurch earthquake. Mutch was not in the building at the time, but the disaster led her to focus on researching how teachers and schools cope with catastrophes such as earthquakes, tsunamis, fires, pandemics, and shootings, and how they recover afterwards. She has conducted research across the Asia Pacific region, including education responses to the 2015 Nepal earthquake, the 2011 Japan tsunami, bushfires in Victoria, and the COVID-19 pandemic. She has become known in some circles as Dr Disaster. Mutch believes that during disasters teachers act as first responders, counsellors and crisis managers, but that they rarely receive recognition for those roles, or enough resources or training to carry out those roles properly. Mutch's other research focuses on educational policy and practice, curriculum development, and social education such as citizenship education.

== Honours and awards ==
Mutch has received a number of university awards. In 2016 she was awarded the Excellence in Postgraduate Research Supervision award in the Faculty of Education awards at Auckland, followed by the 2020 University of Auckland Research Excellence Medal, and the 2023 University of Auckland Research Impact Award.

In 2005, Mutch received the American Educational Research Association's Critical Issues in Curriculum Special Interest Group's Early Career Award.

In 2013 Mutch was made an Honorary Life Member of the Pacific Circle Consortium, an honour which is awarded for those with 25 years of service to the organisation. The Pacific Circle Consortium also awarded Mutch the 2011 Peter Brice Award for Intercultural Understanding, and the 2019 Arthur R King Jnr Award for Curriculum Innovation.

Mutch was appointed a life member of the New Zealand Association for Research in Education in 2018, and in the following year was the winner of the association's McKenzie Award for excellence in educational research in New Zealand.

== Personal life ==
Mutch is married to a former journalist, and her son is a warzone journalist.

== Selected works ==
=== Books ===
- Jennifer Tatebe and Carol Mutch (editors) Understanding enduring ideas in education: A response to those who 'just want to be a teacher' (2017) NZCER Press ISBN 978-1-98-854208-9
- Carol Mutch, Optimising your academic career: Advice for early career scholars. (2017) NZCER Press ISBN 978-0-947509-75-0
- Carol Mutch, Doing Educational Research: A Practitioner's Guide to Getting Started (2 editions) (2005 & 2013). NZCER Press ISBN 978-1-927151-92-1
- Jean Rath and Carol Mutch (editors). Emerging critical scholarship: Navigating the doctoral journey. (2014) Cambridge Scholars Press ISBN 978-1-4438-5702-4
- Carol Mutch, Leua Latai, Jacoba Matapo, Felicia Ward (editors) Talanoa Fogafala: hear our voices: a poetry and art collaboration between the National University of Samoa and the University of Auckland. (2019) University of Auckland. ISBN 9780473469900 paperback, ISBN 9780473469917 hardback

=== Journal articles ===
- Mutch, Carol Anne (2015). "Leadership in times of crisis: Dispositional, relational and contextual factors influencing school principals' actions". International Journal of Disaster Risk Reduction. 14: 186–194. doi:10.1016/j.ijdrr.2015.06.005. Wikidata Q124254782.
- Mutch, Carol Anne (2014). "The role of schools in disaster preparedness, response and recovery: what can we learn from the literature?". Pastoral Care in Education. 32 (1): 5–22. doi:10.1080/02643944.2014.880123. Wikidata Q124254786.
- Mutch, Carol Anne (2015). "The role of schools in disaster settings: Learning from the 2010–2011 New Zealand earthquakes". International Journal of Educational Development. 41: 283–291. doi:10.1016/j.ijedudev.2014.06.008. Wikidata Q124254781.
- Lisa Gibbs; Mutch, Carol Anne; Peter O'Connor; Colin MacDougall (2013). "Research with, by, for and about Children: Lessons from Disaster Contexts". Global Studies of Childhood. 3 (2): 129–141. doi:10.2304/gsch.2013.3.2.129. Wikidata Q61310494.
- Mutch, Carol Anne; Elizabeth Gawith (2014). "The New Zealand earthquakes and the role of schools in engaging children in emotional processing of disaster experiences". Pastoral Care in Education. 32 (1): 54–67. doi:10.1080/02643944.2013.857363. Wikidata Q124254785.
