= Yeshiva Ohel Moshe =

Coordinates: 40.605995°N 73.990581°W

Yeshiva Ohel Moshe is a Bensonhurst-based, Orthodox Jewish day school and shul (synagogue) founded in 1927.

Since 1949, the school and the synagogue, both referred to as Yeshivah Ohel Moshe, have been housed in the same building at 7914 Bay Parkway in the Bensonhurst neighborhood of Brooklyn, New York.

It was led by Rabbi Eliyahu Machlis until his death in 1980.

== The Yeshivah ==
Yeshivah Ohel Moshe was founded as a school for boys in the Sons of Israel building in Brooklyn, eventually moving to the Jewish Community House with Dr Zuckerbrau as principal. In 1933, Rabbi Moshe Berman took over responsibility for the school. It obtained a New York State Regents charter in 1935.

In 1949, Yeshivah Ohel Moshe relocated as a school and synagogue to a new structure at 7914 Bay Parkway in Bensonhurst. Upon completion it was led by Eliyahu Machlis.

Famous graduates include Saul Kassin, Shimon Eider, and ultra successful East New York real estate investor Michael Zakaria.
