= November 2026 technology outages =

Series of technological failures

- Passengers at John F. Kennedy International Airport during the FAA nationwide ground stop
- Date: 12 November 2026 – present
- Location: Primarily the United States; international disruptions
- Type: IT outages, network disruptions, service interruptions
- Cause: Multiple major technical failures; no common cause
- Outcome: Disruptions to aviation, communications, banking, and government information systems

In November 2026, a series of technology outages in the United States have affected a wide range of services, impacting millions of people in the U.S. and worldwide. Outages include but are not limited to a Microsoft outage and an FAA nationwide ground stop. The concurrence of the outages led to widespread speculation on their relation to each other, their causes, and concerns about the reliability of important technology systems.

Several major U.S. national banks and financial services companies (including JPMorgan Chase, Bank of America, and U.S. Bank) also experienced service disruptions and outages that began on November 16. Most of the banks' issues stemmed from disruptions to JPMorgan Chase systems. The National Security Agency's communications network experienced an outage lasting from November 17 to November 20.

In a press release on November 18, Secretary of State Marco Rubio said there is no indication the incidents are related. Top US national security officials told Congress in a hearing that there is no evidence the outages are the result of any coordinated cyber attack.

== Timeline ==
The November 2026 major technology outages currently include:

Incident	Date began	Date ended	Status	Reported cause
Microsoft outage	12 November 2026	14 November 2026	Resolved	A latent software defect in Microsoft's networking gateway servers, compounded by network traffic changes and reduced server capacity. Microsoft stated that the incident was not caused by a cyberattack.
FAA nationwide ground stop	13 November 2026	13 November 2026	Resolved; ground stop lifted	Telecommunications network instability caused by excessive data traffic affecting legacy FAA equipment. Investigators identified possible contributing issues at facilities in Texas and Arkansas; the precise root cause remains under investigation.
Workday, Inc. H.R. services	13 November 2026	14 November 2026	Resolved	Service disruption affecting two data centers affecting thousands of companies.
JPMorgan Chase banking services outage	16 November 2026	16 November 2026	Resolved	A software bug affecting an on-premises hardware system caused transaction processing delays. JPMorgan Chase stated that the problem was not cyber-related and confirmed that transactions were processing normally by Monday evening.
United Airlines outage	16 November 2026	16 November 2026	Resolved	A software issue affected crew-facing apps, flight planning software, weather and other systems needed for safe takeoff.
Customer-reported disruptions involving Bank of America, Wells Fargo, U.S. Bank, Truist, and Capital One	16 November 2026	By 17 November 2026	Customer reports returned to normal	Customers reported problems accessing accounts and processing transactions. JPMorgan Chase's software failure delayed some transactions involving other banks. However, several institutions, including Bank of America, U.S. Bank, and Capital One, stated that their own systems were not directly affected. Some Zelle payments experienced delays, although its network operator reported that the Zelle platform remained operational.
National Security Agency internal communications network outage	17 November 2026	20 November 2026	Resolved	Attributed to the "NSA’s handling of software updates for vulnerabilities in PHP" that caused the agency’s internal messaging system, NSANet, to crash. No evidence of a cyberattack.
Apple, Inc and Apple iOS outages	17 November 2026	Not confirmed	Restoration not confirmed	Reports of customers having issues accessing iCloud, Apple Pay, the App Store, Apple Music, and AppleCare increased starting around noon EST. Apple attributed the outage to an internal update rather than a cyberattack. While many of its systems had been restored, efforts to bring the remaining services back online were still ongoing.

== Developments ==
The outages, which affected numerous businesses in the U.S. and around the world, happened after the midterm elections, coinciding in part with reports of Iran possibly planning to detonate a dirty bomb in Washington, D.C. (November 16, which Iranian officials denied), and a presidential trip to the Philippines and China (November 17-19), which included a trilateral summit with Vladimir Putin and Xi Jinping (November 19).

In the same week, there was a cyberattack to the platform Optimizely (reported on November 17) that compromised the websites of 178 organizations, including Zoom, HSBC, Equifax, CNN, Salesforce, and IKEA, a November 17 smaller outage on the Charles Schwab Corporation app, and a cyberattack on JPMorgan Chase, Visa, and Mastercard (reported on November 19), in which some customer data, including names and emails, were accessed after an attack on a third-party provider. On the same day, a cyberattack on the Department of Agriculture (USDA) was reported, followed by another against the Federal Bureau of Investigation (FBI).

The outages led to a surge in panic buying fueled by on-line rumors and misinformation, with suspected bot accounts responsible for 30% of posts promoting conspiracy theories related to these events. Public concerns were additionally heightened by the concurrent Emergency Alert System test, scheduled for November 17, leading to internationally spread claims that a global or 90-day blackout would start on that day.

== Reactions ==
Officials with the Trump administration have worked to reassure Americans and dismiss fears of a possible crisis. Secretary of State Marco Rubio denied that the outages were connected. "We have zero evidence or any reason to believe that any of these isolated or individual instances have anything to do with nefarious actors, with cyber hackers, with criminals, with another nation state, with a malign actor of any kind," he added. President Trump declared, "It’s life, it’s life. When you’re big and powerful, and you have all the money, things like that happen. It’s fine."

Secretary of Homeland Security Markwayne Mullin gave interviews to the media since the FAA ground stop, stating that there was no evidence at the time of a nefarious attack on the United States, although a "superior intelligence" issue couldn't be ruled out, and that no one was going to be fired, as it was "an issue with the equipment." As the ground stop developed into a series of technology outages, he again said in interviews to Fox News and CNBC that "superior intelligence" may have caused the issues, citing an unnamed person from the technology industry.

On November 18, Mullin, Director of National Intelligence Jay Clayton and FBI Deputy Director Christopher Raia testified before the House Committee on Homeland Security, at a hearing titled "Worldwide Threats to the Homeland: 25 Years After 9/11," where they were questioned on several topics, including the technology outages and the suspected Iranian dirty bomb. Clayton declared that the outages were separate incidents associated with maintenance and technical changes, rather than a coordinated or state-sponsored attack. He attributed part of the explanation to a substantial increase in system upgrades being undertaken by government agencies and private companies. Reuters reported that some of these upgrades and patches were intended in part to address AI-related vulnerabilities, but that applying them on a large scale could itself cause technical disruptions.

Senator James Lankford has demanded an investigation.

=== Analysis ===
With AI increasing the speed at which software flaws can be found, IT teams have rushed to install patches across massive networks without adequate testing. Several such earlier incidents of AI revealing vulnerabilities which resulted in patches, occurred during Black October. According to Computer Weekly, the outages have "sparked a discussion around business continuity and cyber resilience, and speculation over the impact of artificial intelligence systems". According to WWMT, "While the incidents involved different systems, the timing has left some questioning whether the outages could be connected."

== Subsequent developments ==
On November 19, Politico reported that the recently appointed White House Chief of Staff Stephen Miller had sidelined Markwayne Mullin from television appearances after his comments frustrated Trump administration officials.

On the same day, Trump administration's National Cyber Director Sean Cairncross announced he was leaving the Trump administration. Reportedly, he'll be replaced in an acting capacity by Kirsten Davies, chief information officer at the Department of Defense.

Over twenty House lawmakers announced the formation of the bipartisan AI Safety and Innovation Caucus, led by Representatives George T. Whitesides, Don Beyer, and Nathaniel Moran, aiming at creating AI safeguards that mitigate the technology’s risks and ensuring U.S. global leadership in AI technologies. The group would also make efforts to provide a "rapid response" to AI incidents.

== See also ==
- 2026 European infrastructure disruption
- 2026 FAA nationwide ground stop
- Computer security
- Black October (information security)
- November 2026 FBI Hackings
