= 2017 Jewish Community Center bomb threats =

Bomb threats made against Jewish Community Centers worldwide

In early 2017, a wave of more than 2,000 bomb threats were made against Jewish Community Centers in the United States, United Kingdom, Australia, New Zealand, Norway, and Denmark. Two arrests and two convictions were made in connection with the threats: Michael Ron David Kadar, a dual American-Israeli citizen, who received a ten-year sentence, along with Juan M. Thompson, a former journalist, who received a five-year sentence. Kadar was said to have acted out of boredom, while Thompson had sought to frame a woman whom he'd previously dated.

== Theories ==
Jerry Silverman of the Jewish Federations of North America said the threats were part of a "coordinated effort" to intimidate American Jews. In February, during an interview on CNN, U.S. Congressman Jerrold Nadler said that some supporters of Donald Trump were responsible for the threats. Trump denounced the JCC bomb threats and anti-Semitism, and said that this may be a case of someone trying to make others look bad.

In an op-ed for The Baltimore Sun, deputy editor Tricia Bishop said the threats represent a growing attitude of racial intolerance in the United States, but likely no specific group or person was responsible for the threats. She implored readers to "stand up ... before it's your children they come for."

== Perpetrators ==
In March 2017, two persons were arrested on separate charges of making a number of the bomb threats:

=== Israeli-American man ===
A 19-year-old Jewish Israeli-American named as Michael Ron David Kadar, was arrested in March 2017 in Ashkelon, Israel and charged with responsibility for "dozens" of the threats. Kadar had earlier been rejected from enlistment in the Israel Defense Forces due to mental health issues, including autism and brain tumor which allegedly affected his behavior.

According to Israeli police, Kadar had used "advanced technologies" to disguise his voice and mask the fact the calls were originating from Israel. According to court documents, Kadar allegedly advertised on the dark web the service of threatening any school for $30. Kadar's defense attorney said he has a brain tumor, which may have influenced his behavior. He was suspected of threatening over 2,000 different institutions in the US, Israel, Canada, United Kingdom, New Zealand, and Australia. including the Israeli Embassy in Washington, the Israeli consulate in Miami, schools, malls, police stations, hospitals and airlines. His threats reportedly caused fighter jets to be scrambled, planes to dump fuel and make emergency landings, and over 100 schools in Israel to evacuate.

In April 2017, an indictment against Kadar was filed in an Israeli court charging him with several crimes including an attempt to extort a United States senator, "publishing false reports causing public panic, conspiring to commit a crime, hacking computers to commit a crime, and violations of money-laundering laws". In the same month, a similar indictment was filed against him in a federal court in Florida charging him with 28 crimes, and he was separately charged with 3 additional crimes in a federal court in Georgia. Israeli authorities reportedly refused to extradite him to the US, preferring to try him in Israel. In June 2018, he was convicted on hundreds of counts including charges of extortion, publishing false information that caused panic, computer offenses, and money laundering.

In November 2018, he was sentenced in Israel to 10 years in prison, plus a fine and 1 year probation. Kadar full name was not named in Israeli courts because he was tried as a minor, but he was identified in indictment papers issued by the US. He would have been sentenced to 17 years if not for his mental issues: autism spectrum and paranoid delusions. Described as highly intelligent, his crimes earned him $240,000 in Bitcoin, worth over $1 million at the time of the sentence. Kadar refused to hand over the password to his Bitcoin digital wallet.

Kadar was released from an Israeli prison in 2024, but still faced federal charges in the United States. Initially, he fled to Norway to seek asylum, but his request was rejected. Consequently, Norwegian authorities held him in a psychiatric detention facility for nearly two years while he fought his extradition. Ultimately, his appeals failed, and he was extradited to the US to stand trial.

In June 2026, Following his extradition to the United States, Kadar was arraigned in a federal court in Orlando, Florida. He faces multiple federal charges, including hate crimes, obstruction of the free exercise of religion, and making bomb threats against Jewish institutions and kindergartens. If convicted on all counts Kadar faces a maximum penalty of up to 35 years in federal prison.

=== African-American journalist ===
Juan M. Thompson, a former journalist for The Intercept, was charged with responsibility for at least eight of the incidents. According to media reports, Thompson had called in the threats in an attempt to frame a woman whom he had previously dated. According to the Federal Bureau of Investigation, the woman had been the subject of previous harassment by Thompson, which included an alleged attempt by him to falsely report her for possession of child pornography. On 13 June 2017, Thompson pleaded guilty to sending bomb threats to Jewish community centers.

== See also ==
- 2016 Australian school bomb threats
- 2018 Bitcoin bomb threats
