= Jewish Center of Kings Highway =

Synagogue building in Brooklyn, New York

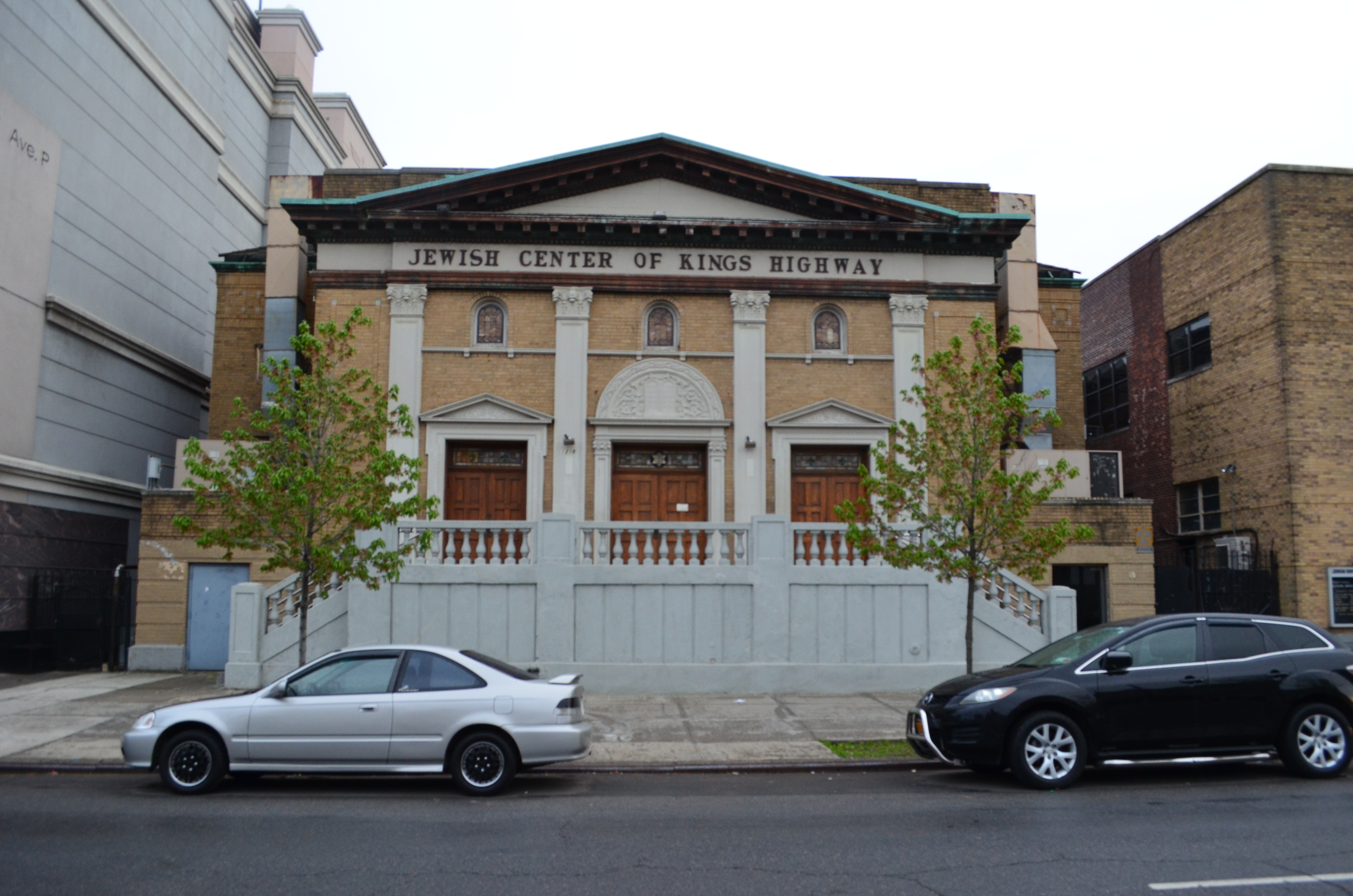

- Location of the former synagogue in New York City

Religion
- Affiliation: Conservative Judaism (former)
- Ecclesiastical or organisational status: Synagogue (former)
- Status: Closed

Location
- Location: 1202-1218 Avenue P, Midwood, Brooklyn, New York City, New York
- Country: United States
- Coordinates: 40°36′36″N 73°57′39″W

Architecture
- Architect: Maurice Courland
- Type: Synagogue architecture
- Style: Neoclassical
- Established: c. 1920 (as a congregation)
- Completed: 1930
- Site area: 8,000 square feet (740 m^{2})
- Jewish Center of Kings Highway
- U.S. National Register of Historic Places
- New York State Register of Historic Places
- NRHP reference No.: 10000009
- NYSRHP No.: 04701.016080

Significant dates
- Added to NRHP: February 12, 2010
- Designated NYSRHP: December 16, 2009

The Jewish Center of Kings Highway is a historic former Conservative Jewish synagogue, located at 1202–1218 Avenue P in the Midwood neighborhood of Brooklyn in New York City, New York, in the United States.

== History ==
The Jewish Center of Kings Highway began as a synagogue and school called Beth HaKnesseth ("House of Assembly") Talmud Torah of Kings Highway. Its first building was building between 1920 and 1922, at 1202–1210 Avenue P; and by 1924 the synagogue had been renamed as the Jewish Center of Kings Highway, with the school retaining the former title.

The synagogue used Jewish community center plan. The first such synagogue/center was formed in 1917 in Manhattan, beginning a community centre movement. The Jewish Center of Brooklyn followed shortly thereafter, with a center that housed a gymnasium, kindergarten, library, classrooms, dining room and synagogue.

The Jewish Center of Kings Highway built a new Neoclassical synagogue building on a slightly larger site, at the same location, between 1928 and 1930, under the leadership of Rabbi Jacob J. Newman and synagogue president Nathaniel J. Levine. The site plan required zoning variances for the proportion of the lot occupied by the building. It was dedicated the weekend of March 28–30, 1930, the building still stands, and is a two-story-with-basement building faced in brick. The former synagogue building has a cast stone temple front with four engaged Corinthian order piers.

Also on the property is a school building built by the Center in 1949.

In 1963, the Conservative congregation was expelled by the national Conservative movement, the United Synagogue of America, for refusing to drop the practice of playing bingo for fund-raising purposes.

The former synagogue building was listed on the National Register of Historic Places in 2010.

Though no longer used as a synagogue, the premises is currently used for a Jewish boys high school.
