= 2026 Microsoft outage =

Global computer systems outage

- Date: November 12–14, 2026
- Location: Worldwide
- Type: IT outage
- Cause: Faulty server updates
- Outcome: Worldwide Microsoft 365 outage, causing global disruption of critical services

A major global Microsoft outage occurred from November 12 to 14, 2026. Problems were reported with numerous Microsoft 365 services, including Outlook, Teams, and Copilot.

== Timeline ==
The outage began on November 12, between 17:00 and 18:00 UTC, initially affecting most Microsoft 365 services. At 17:54 UTC, Microsoft first acknowledged a problem in the Americas with users not being able to access Exchange Online mailboxes. At 18:07 UTC, they warned about broader problems globally. At 23:04 UTC, Microsoft said they were returning some affected servers to service.

The outage followed two days after Microsoft's November Patch Tuesday update, which covered 1,094 vulnerabilities. Microsoft credited artificial intelligence (AI) as the reason for such a large number of bug fixes during a monthly update.

The outage continued into November 13, affecting businesses, airlines, and government agencies worldwide. At 04:36 UTC, Microsoft reported "partial recovery" in some regions. After 16 hours, the outage was mostly narrowed down to Microsoft Exchange, which powers Microsoft's email services including Outlook. Microsoft reported some "encouraging recovery progress" by early morning UTC on November 13, and that email queues were "approaching normal levels" by the afternoon.

The services were fully restored by the morning of November 14.

== Cause ==
Charles Lamanna, the Executive Vice President of Copilot, Agents, and Platform at Microsoft, summarized the root cause analysis in a post on X indicating that there were three issues in Microsoft's networking gateway servers that combined with response and cloud fabric failures to cause the outage:

1. A previously undetected defect that caused networking gateway servers to become unresponsive in certain load conditions. At peak more than 80% of the servers hosting the networking gateway service were unresponsive.
2. A change in traffic allocation in the network fabric increased load and caused the defect to become more likely to manifest.
3. Maintenance applied to the networking gateway service hosts reducing the fleet capacity by 14%.

Automated rollback mechanisms could not mitigate issue 1 as the change causing the error was deployed in July 2026.

The management abstraction of "capacity units" to separate infrastructure failed to isolate the issue, causing it to impact across regions meaning the outage spanned worldwide. Email services provided by Exchange Online could not be moved from the primary group of networking gateway instances to the secondary group of network gateway instances. Other products could, reducing impacts to Teams, OneDrive, SharePoint, and Office apps.

As the code fix to an address 1 was deployed, traffic overwhelmed the servers coming up — an instance of cascading failure caused by stampeding requests. Automated traffic routing had to be disabled to give hosts the ability to recover before receiving requests.

Microsoft 365 customers have been directed to MO1550821 in their admin center tool for further updates.

Microsoft said that the outage was not caused by a cyberattack or AI agents, and blamed the outage on settings applied to servers after an update. They said that a process that establishes secure connections was becoming overwhelmed, which led servers to stop handling requests. They began rolling back the recent network configuration change.

== Impact ==
The outage had significant impact on public and private organizations around the world. Around 430 million people globally use Microsoft 365, and issues were reported across more than 70 countries. Internet search tools making use of Microsoft's services, such as Microsoft Bing, DuckDuckGo and ChatGPT, were also affected. Many jokes and memes circulated online in response to the disruption.

=== Government ===
Government departments in Australia, Japan, the Philippines, Singapore, South Africa and the United States were affected by the disruption. Spy and federal agencies in Australia suffered from minor disruption.

The Japanese government confirmed disruption to the Government Solution Service (GSS), a network system that serves as the foundation for government employees to carry out their daily work. The Supreme Court of the Philippines was affected, warning that "responses to emails and other transactions may be delayed". Singapore also suffered issues in their court systems.

In the United Kingdom, the minister for defence readiness and industry, Luke Pollard, urged for "greater resilience" against technology failures.

In the United States, House of Representatives staff told Politico that "a day of legislative work" had been ended by the outage. Law enforcement agencies also reported issues, including for example in processing prisoners' bail payments.

In Brazil, the president of the Supreme Federal Court, Edson Fachin, at the request of the Order of Attorneys of Brazil, ordered on November 13 the suspension of the counting of procedural deadlines for the 12 and 13 of that month, and the count should be resumed on Monday, November 16.

=== Business ===
Lost productivity from the outage is expected to be high. The Anderson Economic Group think tank estimated it could be about $7 billion. Experts in Australia warned that the outage could cost billions of dollars to businesses in the country, with small businesses hit the hardest.

Due to the outage, companies including Richemont delayed reporting quarterly financial results.

On November 13, 2026, guests at Phantasialand's Hotel Ling Bao in Brühl, Germany suffered injuries after an automatic chlorine dosing system malfunctioned. This malfunction caused excess chlorine levels to be pumped into pool water, affecting guests. 15 people were checked by paramedics, with 5 suffering injuries as a result. The hotel's monitoring system runs on Outlook, and as a result of the outage it was unable to send an email notifying hotel staff of the excess chlorine levels.

=== Healthcare ===
Several hospital networks in Toronto, Canada, including University Health Network, The Hospital for Sick Children, and Sunnybrook Health Sciences Centre reported that they experienced operational difficulties due to the lack of Outlook availability. Unity Health Toronto declared a code grey, indicating infrastructure failure.

The outage caused widespread disruption across the UK's National Health Service (NHS), affecting hundreds of hospitals, general practitioner (GP) practices and community health services. The NHS cancelled some operations, with much of the NHS calendar using Microsoft systems. Many NHS staff were unable to access NHS.net Connect, the platform used for email, meetings and file sharing, and some resorted to using paper patient records. The outage also disrupted the transmission of patient information and urgent referrals, including those relating to cancer and other serious conditions. The Medicines and Healthcare products Regulatory Agency (MHRA) separately reported problems with its email services. The National Pharmacy Association (NPA) warned that the loss of NHS email access was disrupting communication between pharmacies and GP practices, potentially delaying some prescriptions.

=== Education ===
In the UK, the outage caused communication issues in schools. Exam watchdog Ofqual, school leaders' union ASCL, the Department of Education, and many schools across England suffered from major disruption.

== Reactions ==
Reinier van Lanschot, the lead MEP for the EU sovereign cloud, and Sergey Lagodinsky an MEP and reporter for opinion of the EU’s Cloud and AI Development Act, emphasized how vulnerable Europe is for being dependent of a single company. Rupert Goodwins reported this will increase alternatives to Microsoft in Europe. Portuguese legislative assembly member Fabian Figueiredo noted that “in Portugal, Law No. 36/2011 establishes the adoption of open standards in the state’s computer systems, precisely to ensure interoperability and avoid the dependence of a single supplier” and he asked the Government how this law is being complied with and what evaluation it makes of its application.

Sâmia Bomfim, a Brazilian federal deputy, proposed an amendment for the adoption of domestic and open-source technologies.

== See also ==
- 2024 CrowdStrike-related IT outages
- 2026 FAA nationwide ground stop – occurred the day after the outage began
- November 2026 technology outages
