= Eaton Family Residence-Jewish Center of Norwich =

Historic house in New York, United States

Jewish Center of Norwich
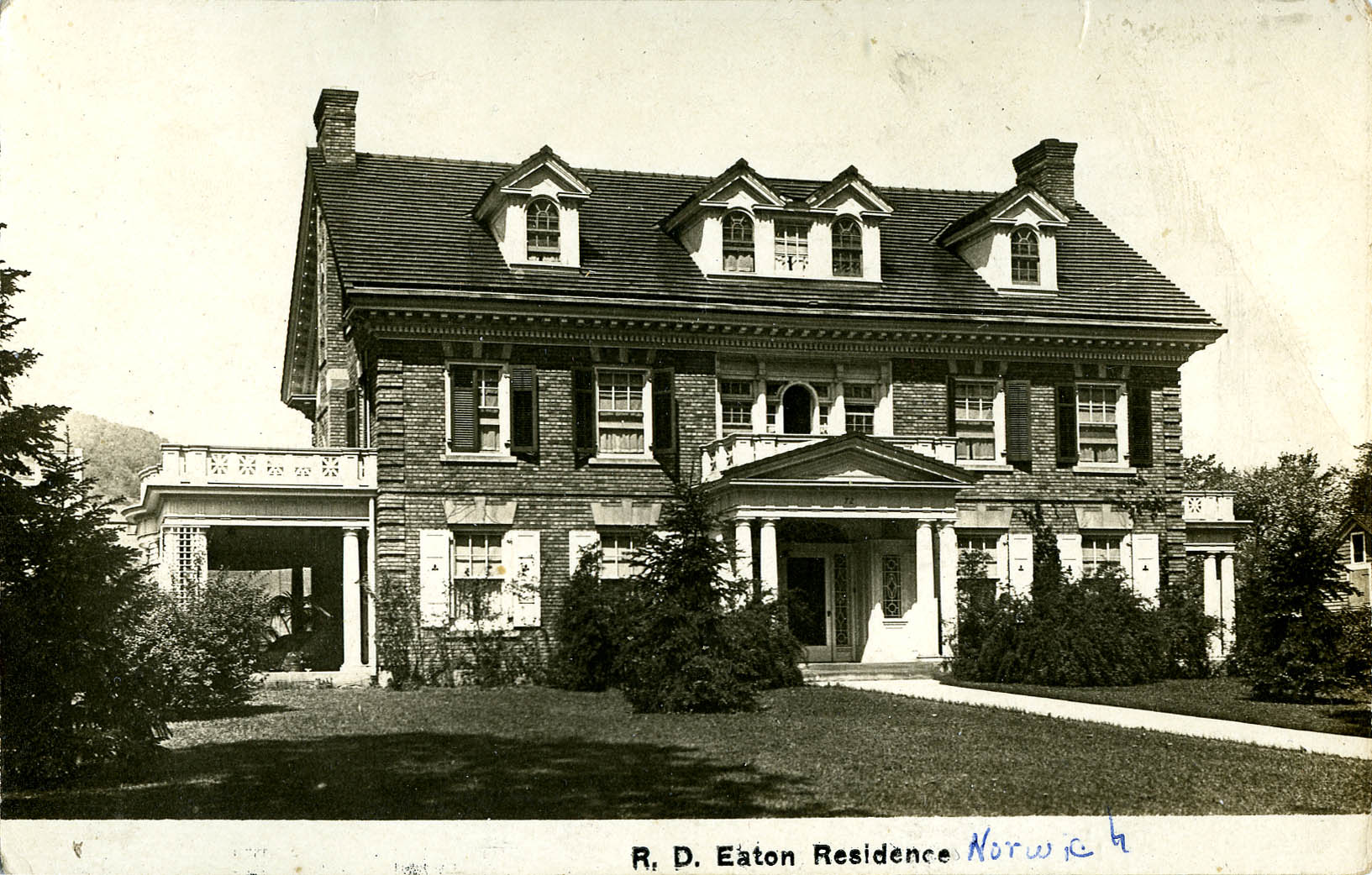

- Location in New York

Religion
- Affiliation: Judaism
- Rite: Unaffiliated
- Ecclesiastical or organizational status: Synagogue and community center
- Status: Active

Location
- Location: 72 South Broad Street, Norwich, New York
- Country: United States
- Interactive map of Jewish Center of Norwich
- Coordinates: 42°31′38.42″N 75°31′24.5″W

Architecture
- Architects: Gaggin & Gaggin
- Type: House
- Style: Colonial Revival
- Completed: 1914 (as a house); 1955 (as a synagogue)
- Eaton Family Residence-Jewish Center of Norwich
- U.S. National Register of Historic Places
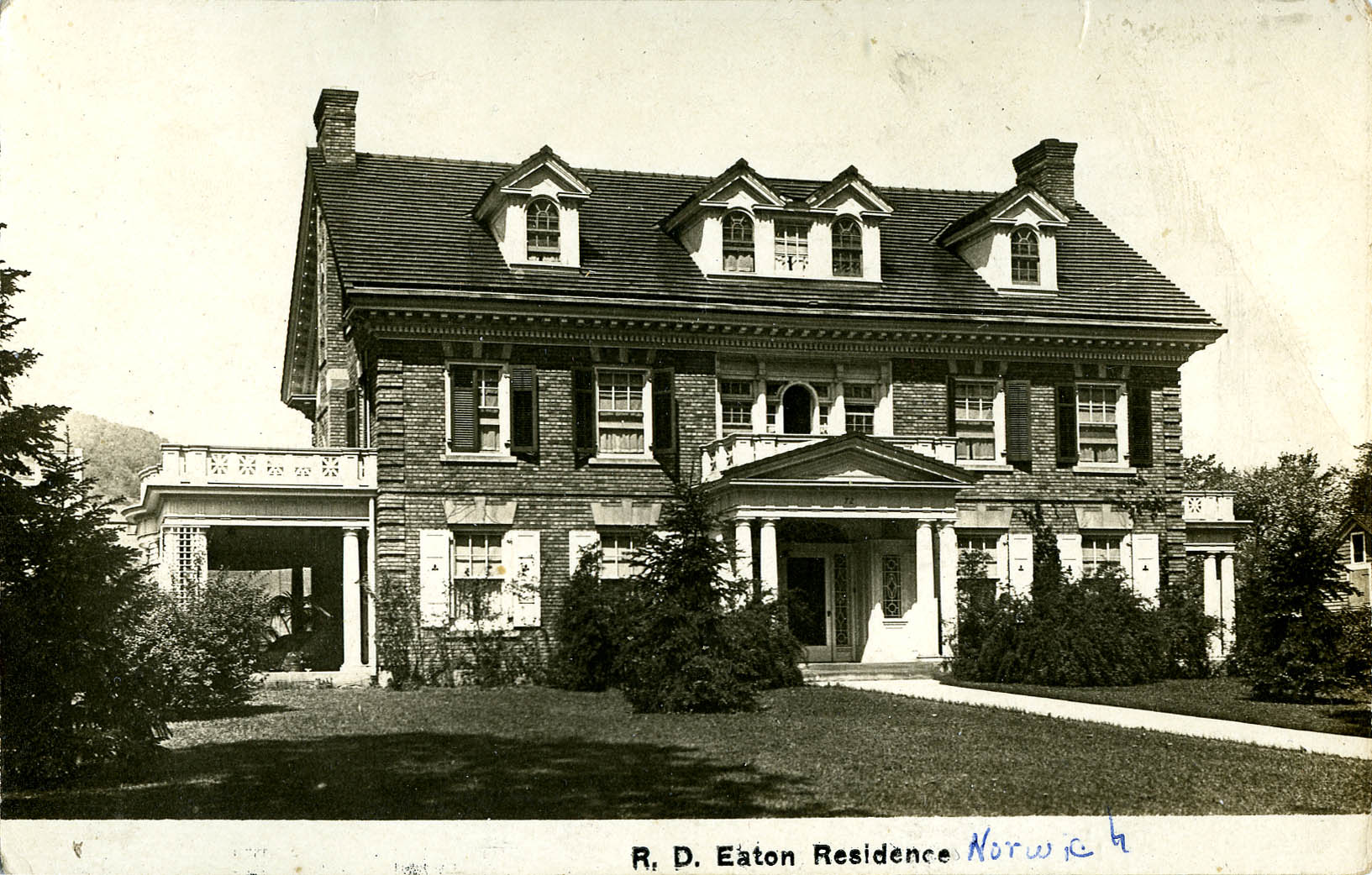
- A black and white image of the R. D. Eaton family home
- Area: 0.9 acres (0.36 ha)
- NRHP reference No.: 09000375
- Added to NRHP: August 26, 2009

The Eaton Family Residence-Jewish Center of Norwich is a historic home, now unaffiliated Jewish synagogue and community center, located at 72 South Broad Street in Norwich, Chenango County, in New York, in the United States.

The house was built in 1914 for R. D. Eaton to house his family, one of the most prominent families in Central New York. The 2 1/2-story, tan brick residence with a green ceramic tile, side-gabled roof resting on a cut stone foundations completed in the Colonial Revival style. The main block is rectangular, five bays wide and two bays deep. The main entrance is set within a prominent one bay wood portico with gabled roof supported by paired, fluted classical columns.

The building has been used as a synagogue and community center by local German-Jewish refugees, since 1955.

The building was added to the National Register of Historic Places in 2009.

In April 2008, the synagogue was vandalised by three teenagers, who were charged with burglary, criminal mischief and conspiracy. With the support of Syracuse University, Nancy Cantor, the university's chancellor, and other benefactors, the former house and synagogue was restored.
