= International Journal of Disaster Risk Reduction =

Academic journal on human and industrial safety

- Discipline: Disaster risk reduction
- Language: English
- Edited by: Carmine Galasso

Publication details
- History: 2012–present
- Publisher: Elsevier
- Frequency: Monthly
- Open access: Hybrid
- Impact factor: 4.2 (2023)

Standard abbreviations
- ISO 4: Int. J. Disaster Risk Reduct.

Indexing
- ISSN: 2212-4209

Links
- Journal homepage; Online archive

The International Journal of Disaster Risk Reduction is a monthly peer-reviewed academic journal that focuses on disasters and mitigation solutions to enhance community preparedness and resilience. It was established in 2012 by David E. Alexander (University College London); since July 2024, Carmine Galasso (University College London) has been the editor-in-chief.

== Abstracting and indexing ==
According to the Journal Citation Reports, the journal has a 2023 impact factor of 4.2.
