= Jewish Center of Brighton Beach =

Synagogue building in Brooklyn, New York

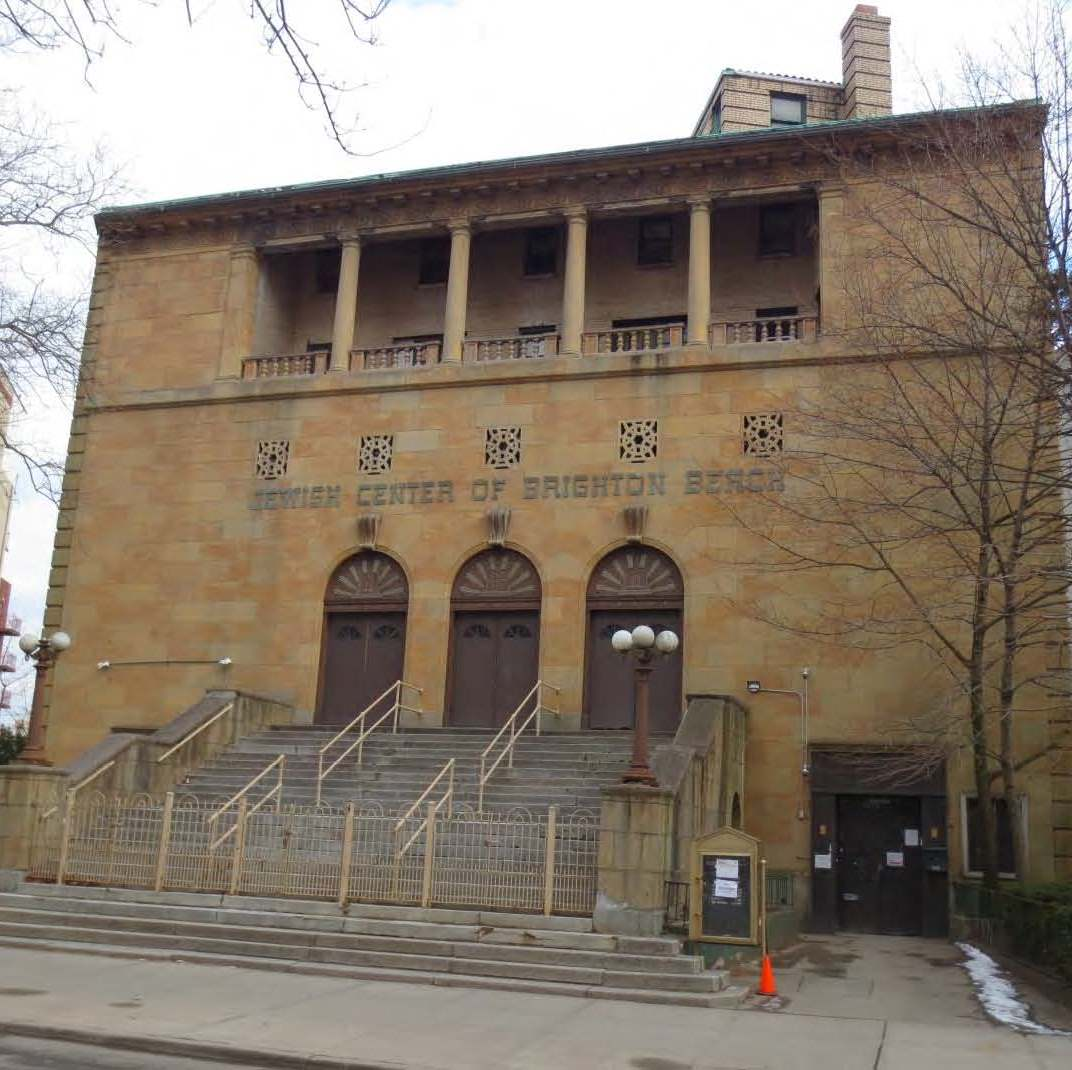
- Synagogue's former building, in September 2014

- Location in New York City

Religion
- Affiliation: Orthodox Judaism (former)
- Ecclesiastical or organisational status: Synagogue (former)
- Status: Open

Location
- Location: 2915 Ocean Parkway, Brooklyn, New York City
- Country: United States
- Coordinates: 40°34′47″N 73°58′01″W

Architecture
- Architects: Bloch & Hesse
- Type: Synagogue architecture
- Style: Renaissance Revival
- Established: 1914 (as a congregation)
- Completed: 1930

Specifications
- Direction of façade: West
- Site area: 24,000 square feet (2,200 m^{2})
- Materials: Stone; tiles
- Jewish Center of Coney Island
- U.S. National Register of Historic Places
- New York State Register of Historic Places
- Area: Less than 1.0 acre (0.40 ha)
- NRHP reference No.: 13000908
- NYSRHP No.: 04701.017324

Significant dates
- Added to NRHP: December 11, 2013
- Designated NYSRHP: September 26, 2013

The Jewish Center of Brighton Beach, named as the Jewish Center of Coney Island prior to 1947, is a historic Orthodox Jewish former synagogue and community center, located in the Brighton Beach neighborhood of Brooklyn, New York, United States.

== History ==
The formation of the Brooklyn Jewish Center combined the three leading Brownsville Jewish organizations – the Hebrew Educational society, the Stone Avenue Talmud Torah, and the Congregation Ohav Sholom – into one entity. The first Jewish community center was formed in 1917 in Manhattan, beginning a community centre movement. The Jewish Center of Brooklyn followed shortly thereafter, with a center that housed a gymnasium, kindergarten, library, classrooms, dining room and synagogue.

The congregation was founded in 1914 on West 5th Street in Coney Island (originally named Temple Adath Israel), and when building the community centre in 1929–1930, renamed itself as the Jewish Center of Coney Island. In 1947, the name was changed to the Jewish Center of Brighton Beach.

The former synagogue is a four-story-with-basement trapezoidal-shaped building in the Renaissance Revival style. The front façade is clad in golden-colored stone and features a grand staircase and second story loggia. The building is capped by a hipped roof of red tile.

The former synagogue building was listed on the National Register of Historic Places in 2013.

Soluri Architecture were engaged to redesign the 24,000-square-foot (2,200 m^{2}) building in a more modern and practical style.

The synagogue building was featured in Lord of War, a 2005 crime drama film starring Nicolas Cage.
