= 2016 Australian school bomb threats =

Series of hoaxes in Australia

- Location: Various schools throughout New South Wales, Victoria, Queensland, Australian Capital Territory and South Australia, Australia
- Date: January and February 2016
- Target: School children and staff
- Attack type: Hoax bomb threat
- Perpetrator: Michael Ron Davis Kadar
- Motive: Boredom

A large number of Australian schools received hoax bomb threats in late January and early February 2016. Other similar phone threats, including school shootings and chemical attacks, were also received by a number of schools across Victoria, New South Wales and Queensland. A total of 591 threatening calls were received by Australian schools.

The police response to the threats was rapid and widespread, and many schools across Australia were evacuated immediately. Widespread media coverage also followed the threats, which drew the attention of the international community.

The threats were initially reported to have originated from overseas hackers, while reports from inside the Australian education sector said the calls came from or were affiliated with Nossal High School. An organisation called Evacuation Squad claimed responsibility for the calls. A French citizen was later detained for possible involvement with hoax bomb threats across the world, including Australia, but was later released. The voice on the phone was reported to have been a computerised voice with an American accent.

The calls were eventually discovered to have been made by Israeli–United States dual citizen Michael Ron David Kadar, who made the hoax calls from Israel. While the motive of Kadar remains not entirely confirmed, he has stated to the media and to the court on numerous occasions that he made the threats out of boredom. Kadar was diagnosed with autism as a child. Following his trial for the making of the threats, he was sentenced to 10 years imprisonment in Israel.

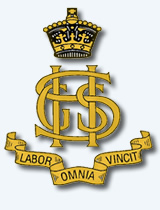
Sydney Girls High School was one of the many schools targeted in the hoax calls.

The threats also correlated with similar threatening calls to Jewish community centres, schools and universities, across the United States, the United Kingdom and New Zealand. Kadar largely targeted schools and Jewish organisations.

== Threats ==
=== Friday, 29 January 2016 ===
Four schools in Victoria and several schools in New South Wales received bomb threat calls on 29 January 2016. Threats were made against schools in Mona Vale, Woolooware, Richmond, Ulladulla, Lake Illawarra, and Penrith between 10:50am and 11:10am. Several schools were swept by police who declared the calls to be hoaxes, allowing students to return to class by 2:30pm.

=== Monday, 1 February 2016 ===
Nine schools in New South Wales received bomb threat calls on 1 February 2016. The calls were reported to police as having been delivered by a computerised voice. The calls composed of violent threats such as shootings and bombings. Most of these schools evacuated students, however some chose to place students in lockdown instead. Following investigations of school grounds for any suspicious or threatening objects, New South Wales Police Force spokespersons told media that the threats were unlikely to be related to terrorism and they unlikely to be substantive.

=== Tuesday, 2 February 2016 ===
On 2 February 2016, 17 Victorian schools received calls, which were similar to the threats to New South Wales schools. Again, it was reported that the threats were delivered over the phone by a computerised voice. The substance of the threats was also similar, but it was reported that threats of chemical attacks were also delivered to these schools.

A further five schools in the Australian Capital Territory also received similar threats throughout Tuesday. Police promptly searched those schools involved, before releasing a statement that nothing of suspicion had been found to indicate that the threats were substantial.

A total of 10 schools in Queensland also received threats on Tuesday, before being evacuated.

- Surfers Paradise State School (South East Region)
- Oxenford State School (South East Region)
- Caningeraba State School (South East Region)
- Macgregor State High School (Metropolitan Region)
- The Gap State High School (Metropolitan Region)
- Bounty Boulevard State School (North Coast Region)
- Buddina State School (North Coast Region)
- Glenmore State High School (Central Queensland Region)
- Townsville State High School (North Queensland Region)
- Woree State School (Far North Queensland Region)

=== Wednesday, 3 February 2016 ===
A further three schools in Victoria and seven schools in Queensland received threatening calls on Wednesday and were evacuated. The content and nature of the calls were identical to those made to schools on earlier days.

=== Friday, 5 February 2016 – Thursday, 11 February 2016 ===
A range of schools around Australia received continued phone threats at staggered times and on varying dates. The calls seemingly stopped on 11 February 2016.

A total of 44 separate incidents took place in the course of the delivery of the threats at a range of schools, in the first week of the threats being made. These included nine schools in New South Wales, 20 schools in Victoria, 10 schools in Queensland, and five schools in the Australian Capital Territory. In total, 591 bomb threats were made to Australian schools over the first week and following weeks.

== Response and investigation ==
=== Police ===
The police response to the threats was reported by various media outlets as being rapid, extensive, and effective. The immediate police response involved officers from the respective state police forces of each involved state (New South Wales Police Force, Queensland Police Service, Victoria Police, South Australia Police) as well as the Australian Federal Police (AFP).

Police played an important role in the immediate response to the bomb threats. This included assisting in the evacuation of schools and surrounding areas, marshalling students who had been evacuated, searching schools for signs of potential explosives, and clearing schools, labelling the calls as hoaxes and threats.

The police response highlighted the tendency of bomb threats, whether substantial or not, to cause mass disruption to public proceedings. While no bombs were ever discovered or used, the threats alone led to the evacuation of hundreds of schools and a mass media response and international investigation. The complexity and difficulty of bomb hoax situations was highlighted by the Chief Commissioner of Victorian Police, Graham Ashton, who stated that each hoax must be treated as a genuine threat to public safety, as "it may be that particular call that might come in that is not a hoax".

Police also played an important role in tracking down both Kadar's identity and whereabouts. The Victoria Police e-crime squad, fraud and cybercrime squad from the New South Wales Police Force and South Australia electronic crime detectives, alongside the Australian Federal Police and other Australian intelligence organisations including the Australian Security Intelligence Organisation (ASIO) and Australian Signals Directorate (ASD), reportedly played a key role in the international investigation to track down Kadar. According to a police spokeswoman, the Israeli police who arrested Kadar "could not have done it without [the assistance of Victoria Police]".

=== Media ===
The media response to the bomb threats was widespread and immediate. Notable media organisations covering the events included the Australian Broadcasting Corporation (ABC), The Australian, The Sydney Morning Herald, The Guardian, The Daily Telegraph, Special Broadcasting Service (SBS) and Nine News. The widespread and rapid reaction by the media to the threats is typical in the case of bomb threats, demonstrating their effectiveness in causing panic and alarm within society.

However, such a rapid media response can prove disadvantageous in containing rumours and misinformation surrounding bomb threat events. This was evident in the Sydney Morning Herald Article, “Waves of school bomb threats across Australia blamed on overseas hackers”, as it was later discovered that this was not the source of the calls.

=== Government ===
Various government officials both within Australia and overseas spoke out against the calls during the period in which they were delivered. The Federal Bureau of Investigation in the United States attempted to have Kadar extradited following his arrest in Israel, however this request was rejected by Israeli officials.

Victorian Education Minister James Merlino stated "these anonymous cowards will feel the full force of the law" when addressing media about the threats. He also stated that tracking down hackers who use the dark web to deliver such threats "isn't an easy area of law enforcement" but reassured the public that the Australian Federal Police were working alongside other state authorities, and with police groups internationally, to track down the perpetrators. Federal Education Minister, Simon Birmingham released statements condoning the quick response by federal and state agencies and authorities in investigating the source of the threats, alongside the Department of Education.

== Arrest and sentencing ==
Kadar was arrested in the town of Ashkelon, in Israel, in March 2017. This was following an international investigation led in Australia by the Victoria Police e-crime squad. He was charged with making over 2,000 threats to various locations in various countries around the world and was found guilty in June. He was sentenced to 10 years imprisonment by an Israeli judge.

Kadar's central argument through his case was that many of the calls were made while he was a minor. Evidence was also provided to the Court which attempted to demonstrate that Kadar had a brain tumour that caused autism, as well as other mental problems, and so he should not be held criminally liable or legally competent. Despite this evidence, the judge declared that Kadar had a high IQ and a high understanding of his wrongdoing.

Kadar was found guilty of several offences including extortion, disseminating hoaxes in order to spread panic, money laundering and computer hacking. The District Court Judge, Zvi Gurfinkel noted:

"One can imagine... the major inconvenience and fright caused when it was necessary to evacuate students from schools, following the hoax calls that there were bombs there..."

Prior to his sentencing, Kadar was issued a criminal complaint notice in the US State of Florida, seeking his arrest. The complaint described Kadar's offences as 'Making Threatening Interstate Communications' and 'Making Interstate Threats Related to Explosives'. Despite the United States seeking the extradition of Kadar following his arrest in Israel, Israeli authorities chose to prosecute Kadar in Israel instead.

== Motive ==
=== Common motives of bomb threat callers ===
In most cases, the motive of those making bomb threats is to cause disruption. However, bomb threats can also be motivated by political means, or for the purpose of terrorist activities. The threats were made following the Lindt Cafe Siege which took place in 2014, resulting in many Australians being on high alert for terrorist activity when the threats were made, however this was not the case.

=== Kadar's motive ===
Kadar has stated on multiple occasions that he made the threats “out of boredom”. His parents have stated that due to his autism-causing brain tumor, and other mental health problems, he was unable to understand the nature of his action. Their claims were reinforced by the finding by psychiatrists that Kadar is on the autism spectrum. Kadar has stated:

"I did it out of boredom. It was like a game. I understand that it is wrong, and I am sorry and will not do it again."

However, it was also discovered that Kadar offered a private threat-making service online, from which he had accrued approximately $240,000 of earnings. It is unknown whether he was employed by a group to make the threatening calls to Australian schools and has been accepted by the courts that he did so on his own accord.

== Related events and threats ==
During the same period when Kadar made threats to Australian schools, he also carried out a number of other attacks on a variety of institutions in other countries. He called and threatened institutions in countries including the United States, the United Kingdom, New Zealand, Norway and Denmark. Kadar targeted schools, community centres, and primarily Jewish or Jewish-related organisations and places of worship. This resulted in a criminal complaint being issued for Kadar in the United States District Court of Florida for the offences of 'Making Threatening Interstate Communications' and 'Making Interstate Threats Related to Explosives'.

In early 2017, following the period throughout which the threats were made against Australian schools, a number of bomb threats were made to Jewish community centres in the United States, United Kingdom, Australia, New Zealand, Norway and Denmark by Kadar. Like the threats made against Australian schools, these threats were delivered via computerised messaged, and resulted in widespread panic and evacuations.

== Aftermath ==
Following these school bomb threats, literature has been published by Karlene Tipler which outlines the ideal response for schools in a similar situation. This includes the six-stage model proposed by Tipler. The six stages are, 1) alerts; 2) safety behaviours; 3) response actions; 4) student release / family reunification’ 5) temporary school closure; 6) business as usual. The stages are designed to minimize harm and seek to “enhance school safety efforts”.

A study by Carol Mutch has also revealed that schools in Australia, particularly those which were targeted by the initial bomb threats, will be better suited to deal with such crises in the future. This is because of “cumulative learning”, or the ability of schools to benefit and learn from repeated events, by developing alternative methods for responding, and learning lessons from mistakes made.

== See also ==
- 2017 Jewish Community Center bomb threats
- 2005 Brisbane bomb hoax
- 2014 Lindt Cafe Siege
