= Edith and Carl Marks Jewish Community House of Bensonhurst =

Jewish community organization in Bensonhurst, Brooklyn

Coordinates: 40.6064°N 73.9898°W

- Nickname: The "J"
- Formation: 1927
- Type: 501(c)(3)
- Headquarters: Bensonhurst, Brooklyn
- Location: New York City, United States
- Parent organization: UJA-Federation of New York
- Website: jchb.org

The Edith and Carl Marks Jewish Community House of Bensonhurst, sometimes shortened to "the J" or "the JCH", was incorporated in 1927 and has helped over one million Jews in the Bensonhurst neighborhood of Brooklyn, New York City.

The JCH initially served as a community center for Eastern European Jewish immigrants and their children. As the complexion of the Jewish community in Bensonhurst changed, its community center changed in accord. During the 1940s and 1950s, a large influx of Syrian Jews immigrated to the area. In the 1980s, a third wave of immigrants, this time from the former Soviet Union, once again shifted the focus of the community center.

== Services ==
The JCH offers a number of social service programs. Included in those programs are:

- Nutrition Outreach and Education Program.
- Financial and mental health counseling.
- Citizenship application aid
- Family Violence Prevention Program
- Hurricane Assistance Center
- LGBT Refugee Center.

For the third wave (from Eastern Europe), much of their work with adults focuses on housing and job search. Many of these beneficiaries came with training, education and valuable skills, but in some cases age and new health issues created new needs for help.

At times they assist in end-of-life situations.

The community center focuses a lot on children and teens; establishing after school aid programs, tutoring classes, summer camps, Farber-Bruch early childhood center, Zehut teen center, and a Cammarata youth sports center.

== Notable former members ==
- Harvey Fierstein - Tony Award-winning writer of Torch Song Trilogy, and gay rights activist
- Gary David Goldberg - creator of television series such as Family Ties, Spin City and Brooklyn Bridge
- Sandy Koufax - Member of the Baseball Hall of Fame; he played basketball as well as other sports as a teenager.
- Larry King - award-winning talk show host
