= Congregation Beth Israel / West Side Jewish Center =

Orthodox synagogue in Manhattan, New York

West Side Jewish Center
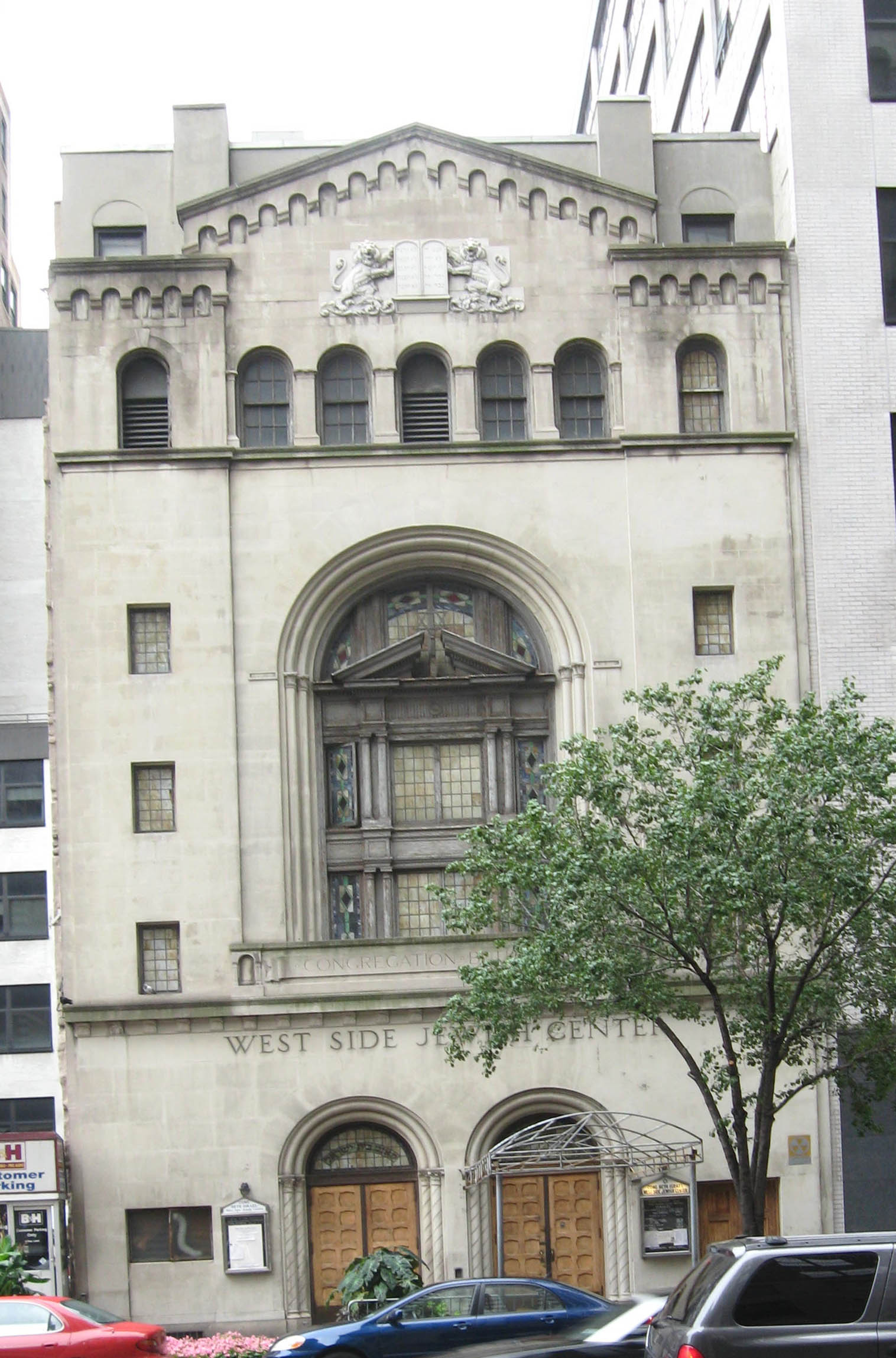
- West Side Jewish Center façade, in 2008

- Location in Manhattan

Religion
- Affiliation: Orthodox Judaism
- Ecclesiastical or organisational status: Synagogue
- Leadership: Rabbi Jason Herman
- Status: Active

Location
- Location: 347 West 34th Street, Manhattan, New York City, New York 10001
- Country: United States
- Coordinates: 40°45′11″N 73°59′43″W

Architecture
- Architects: Gronenberg & Leuchtag
- Type: Synagogue
- Style: Neo-classical
- Established: 1890 (as a congregation)
- Groundbreaking: 1924
- Completed: c. 1890s (252 West 35th St #1); 1905 (252 West 35th St #2); 1925 (347 West 34th St)

Website
- westsidejewishcenter.org

Congregation Beth Israel, commonly referred to as the West Side Jewish Center or, in more recent years, the Hudson Yards Synagogue, is an Orthodox Jewish congregation and synagogue located at 347 West 34th Street, in the Garment District of Manhattan, in New York City, New York, in the United States. Established in 1890, the congregation completed its current building near Penn Station in 1925.

Rabbi Jason Herman has served as rabbi since 2005. Previous rabbis have included Joseph Schick, Norman Lamm, and Solomon Kahane.

== History ==
=== Early years ===
Congregation Beth Israel West Side Jewish Center was established in 1890 by Orthodox German Jews and Jews from Austria-Hungary. In its early years the congregation worshiped at 252 West 35th Street, a building later purchased by St. Paul Baptist Church.

In 1905, the congregation constructed a new synagogue building at 252 West 35th Street, designed by architect John H. Knubel. Its sanctuary sat 600. In 1924, the congregation broke ground for its current three-story building at 347 West 34th Street. The "somber" Neo-classical building, designed by Gronenberg & Leuchtag, was completed in 1925.

=== Recent years ===
The synagogue was in the news in 2007. The congregation rents the entire side of its building for advertisements and parking and that year it was covered with a huge billboard for the film Resident Evil: Extinction. The image did not offend any members, according to Herman, and the congregation who mainly found out after the fact, we’re convinced that the additional income generated by the billboard helpful for maintaining the building.

In 2015 the congregation began a multi-year process with architect Esther Sperber to explore options for renovating the synagogue building. At one point it considered a proposal to demolish the existing structure, and replace it with a large, multi-story multi-use synagogue and condominium. However, in 2016 Herman, and the congregation president, stated that the membership had "quite overwhelmingly rejected any plans for demolition of our current synagogue building and any plan we might pursue will preserve our existing synagogue structure". The president stated that congregation would instead probably renovate the existing structure so that it conformed with current building codes, and develop the synagogue-owned parking lot next to the building. A recent article written in the JTA detailed some of these plans as of 2019.

In 2016, the synagogue began using the additional name Hudson Yards Synagogue.

== Rabbinical leadership ==
Dr. Joseph Schick became rabbi in 1926. Born in Ónod in Austria-Hungary in 1892, he served as a chaplain in the Austro-Hungarian army during World War I, and was the rabbi of Budapest's Beth Israel synagogue of 1918 to 1922, then emigrated to the United States. His books The Kaddish: Its Power for Good and Joseph's Harvest were published in 1928 and 1932 respectively. He served until his death in 1938, at age 49.

Schick was succeeded in 1939 by Harry M. Katzen and then William Novack, and then in 1940 by Leo Ginsburg.

=== 1950s to 2000 ===
In 1952, Norman Lamm, later president of Yeshiva University for over 25 years, was appointed to the role. He would serve 11 momths, before moving to the (unrelated) Upper West Side Jewish Center in 1958.

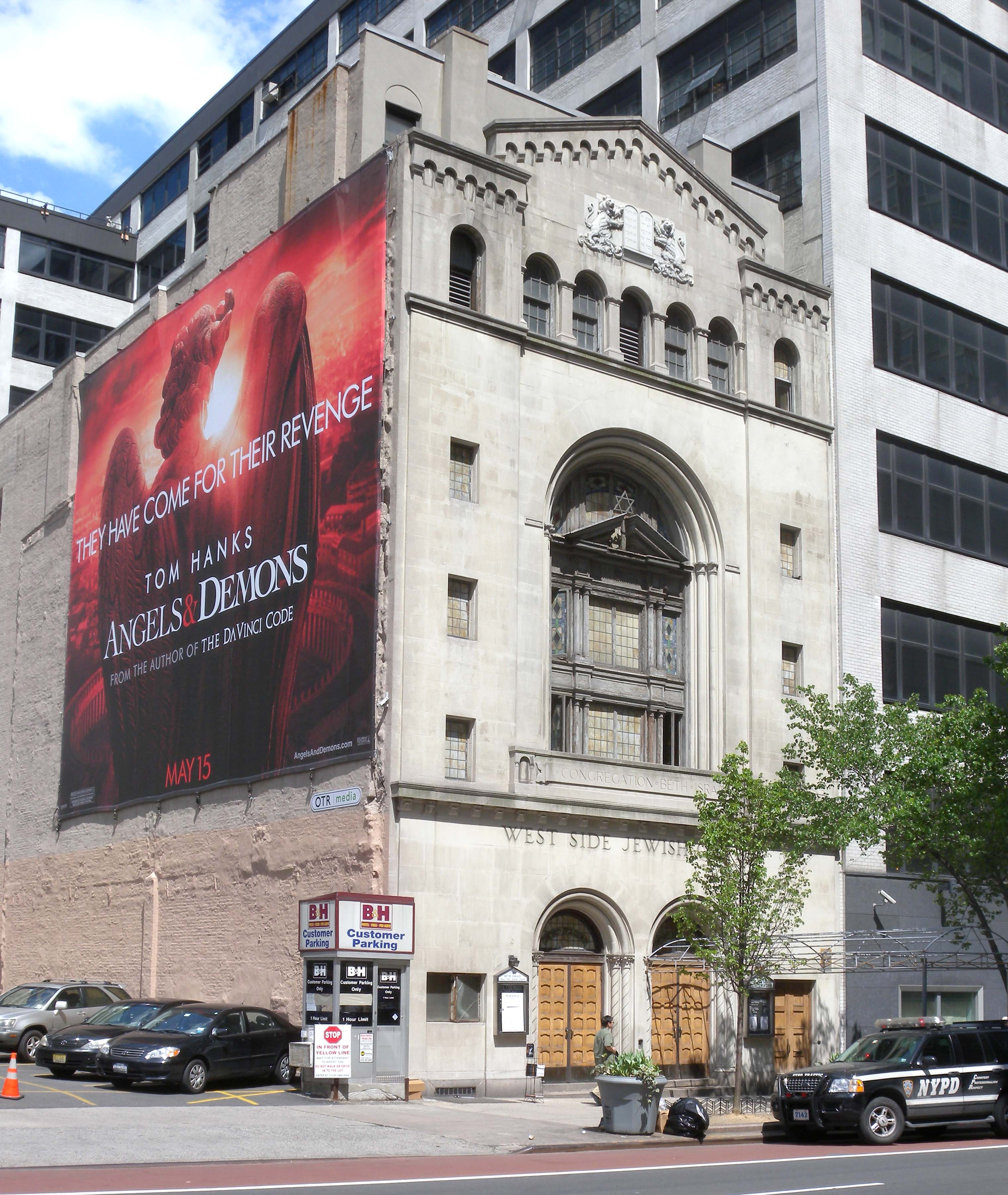
Billboard for the film Angels & Demons on the side of the synagogue building

Solomon (Shlomo) Kahane, ordained in 1954 at Yeshiva University, was subsequently rabbi of the congregation for 38 years and widely considered the synagogue's most prominent Rabbi. He died in April, 2004. He was a first cousin of Rabbi Meir Kahane, the founder of the Jewish Defense League and the Israeli political party Kach. The Jewish Defense League's first meeting was held at the West Side Jewish Center on June 18, 1968.

=== Leadership since 2000 ===
Kahane was succeeded by Dr. Richard Weiss. A licensed physician, Rabbi Weiss subsequently became rabbi of Young Israel of Hillcrest in Queens.

Jason Herman succeeded Weiss as the congregation's spiritual leader. Herman received a degree at Yeshivat Chovevei Torah. He is the executive director of the International Rabbinic Fellowship, serves as an officer of the New York Board of Rabbis and the Zionist Rabbinic Coalition, is the founder of the Israel Academic Institute and is a past fellow at Rabbis Without Borders. Known for his activism, he was one of 22 Rabbis arrested at the United Nations in 2007 after a protest demanding Iranian President Mahmoud Ahmedinejad be barred from speaking to the General Assembly. In 2008, he was one of a group of individuals who boycotted kosher meat from Agriprocessors over concerns that the company's practices were unethical.

Herman discovered in 2017 that his name had been added to a "blacklist" of 160 rabbis whose credentials were rejected for the purposes of certifying to the Chief Rabbinate of Israel that individuals in Israel claiming to be Jewish were, in fact, Jewish. He surmised that it was because of a letter he had written in 2012 vouching for a non-Orthodox Jewish woman. Oddly, after a different married rabbi vouched for the individual, the Rabbinate allowed Herman to officiate at the wedding.

== Citations ==
- American Hebrew and Jewish Messenger, American Hebrew Publishing Corporation, Volume 147, Issue 2, 1940.
- American Jewish Committee. ""Directories"" (PDF). (6.06 MB), American Jewish Year Book, Jewish Publication Society, Volume 21 (1919–1920).
- Congregation Beth Israel West Side Jewish Center website. Retrieved October 17, 2010.
  - History, Congregation Beth Israel West Side Jewish Center website, About Us. Retrieved October 17, 2010.
  - Rabbi's Page, Congregation Beth Israel West Side Jewish Center website. Retrieved April 11, 2019.
- Dunlap, David W. From Abyssinian to Zion: A Guide to Manhattan's Houses of Worship, Columbia University Press, 2004. ISBN 978-0-231-12542-0
- Dunlap, David W. "Zombie Apocalypse on a Synagogue Wall", The New York Times, City Room, August 28, 2007.
- Friedman, Robert I. The False Prophet: Rabbi Meir Kahane—From FBI Informant to Knesset Member, Lawrence Hill Books, 1990. ISBN 978-1-55652-078-5
- Herman, Jason. "My Time in Jail", My Jewish Learning website, May 1, 2007. Retrieved April 11, 2019.
- Levitt, Ellen.Walking Manhattan: 30 Strolls Exploring Cultural Treasures, Entertainment Centers, and Historical Sites in the Heart of New York City, Wilderness Press, 2015. ISBN 978-0-89997-764-5
- Malz, Judy. "This Blacklisted Orthodox Rabbi Was Barred From Vouching for a Jewish Bride – but Still Allowed to Officiate at Her Wedding", Haaretz, July 12, 2017.
- The New York Times, no byline:
  - "Dr. Joseph Schick, Jewish Center Rabbi; Served West Side Organization for Twelve Years-Dies After Short Illness", The New York Times, March 18, 1938, p. 19.
  - "'Loss To Humanity' Seen; Free Sons of Israel Send Message to Bishop Donahue", The New York Times, February 13, 1939, p. 2.
  - "Jews At New Year, Study Role In War; 'Ideal College Girl'", The New York Times, September 15, 1939, p. 20.
  - "Galento and Baer to Fight May 28, as Scheduled.; Boxing Clan Is Sad At Jacobs's Death", The New York Times, April 26, 1940, Sports section p. 33.
  - "West Side Jewish Center Names Spiritual Leader", The New York Times, November 22, 1952, p. 14.
  - Deaths: Kahane, Rabbi Solomon", The New York Times, April 20, 2004.
- Nussbaum Cohen, Debra. "Pressure Seen Mounting Against Kosher Meat Giant", The Jewish Week, May 28, 2008.
- Oswald, John A. "Historic New York Shul Considers, Then Rejects, ‘SynaCondo’ Plan", The Forward, January 18, 2016.
- Rosenstein, Neil. The Unbroken Chain: Biographical Sketches and the Genealogy of Illustrious Jewish Families from the 15th–20th Century, CIS Publishers, 1990. ISBN 978-0-9610578-4-8
- Sales, Ben. "These rabbis have no idea why they’re on the Israeli Chief Rabbinate’s ‘blacklist’", Jewish Telegraphic Agency, July 13, 2017.
- Traiman, Alex. "22 Jewish Leaders Arrested Calling for Removal of Iran at UN", Arutz Sheva, Jewish Community Relations Council of Riverdale website, April 17, 2007.
- West Side Jewish Center, Orthodox Union website, 2000. Retrieved October 17, 2010.
- Weiss, M.D., Rabbi Richard Archived 2011-07-26 at the Wayback Machine, Rabbinical Council of America website, June 7, 2007. Retrieved October 17, 2010.
- Wheatcroft, Geoffrey. The Controversy of Zion: Jewish Nationalism, the Jewish State, and the Unresolved Jewish dilemma, Addison-Wesley Publishing, 1996. ISBN 978-0-201-56234-7
- History, Upper West Side Jewish Center website. Retrieved October 17, 2010.
- ""Classnotes"" (PDF). Archived from the original (PDF) on September 2, 2006. (11.7 MB), Yeshiva University Review, Winter 2005.
