= Jewish Community Center =

Social and recreational organizations for the Jewish communities of various cities

Jewish Community Centers Association of North America
- Predecessor: Hebrew Young Men's Literary Association, Young Men's Hebrew Association (YMHA), Jewish Welfare Board
- Founded: 1854; 172 years ago
- Founder: Dr. Aaron Friedenwald
- Founded at: Baltimore, Maryland, U.S.
- Legal status: 501(c)(3) nonprofit organization
- Purpose: JCC Association leads and connects the JCC Movement, advancing and enriching North American Jewish life.
- Headquarters: 520 Eighth Avenue, New York, NY 10018 U.S.
- Coordinates: 40.753591°N 73.991950°W
- Region served: North America
- President, Chief Executive Officer: Barak Hermann
- Subsidiaries: The Florence G Heller JCC Association Research Center Inc _{501(c)(3)}
- Website: www.jcca.org

A Jewish Community Center or Centre (JCC) is a general recreational and social organization serving the Jewish community in a number of cities. JCCs promote Jewish culture and heritage through holiday celebrations, Israel-related programming, and other Jewish education, however, they are open to everyone in the community.

JCC Association of North America is the continental umbrella organization for the Jewish Community Center movement, which includes nearly 150 JCCs, YM–YWHAs, and camp sites in the U.S. and Canada.

== History ==
The Hebrew Young Men's Literary Association was first set up in 1854 in a building at the corner of Fayette and Gay Streets in Baltimore, Maryland to provide support for Jewish immigrants. Dr. Aaron Friedenwald was the group's founder and first president.

The first Young Men's Hebrew Association (YMHA) was founded in New York City on October 10, 1874, with Lewis May as its first president. The first official headquarters were at 112 West 21st Street in Manhattan. Young Women's Hebrew Association (YWHA) was first established as an annex to the YMHA in 1888. YWHA was founded to provide spiritual and material support for the young Jewish women who were moving to cities at the time. YMHA helped young Jewish women find housing and employment. Fannie Liebovitz was one of the founders. The first independent YWHA was established in 1902. The New York YMHA and YWHA now operate together as the 92nd Street Y. (There are two other YM–YWHA organizations in Manhattan, which are not affiliated with the 92nd Street Y. They are the 14th Street Y, and the YM & YWHA of Washington Heights and Inwood. The 14th Street Y, in the Gramercy/East Village neighborhood, is a branch of the Educational Alliance. The Washington Heights organization serves a diverse community uptown.) In 1917, these organizations were combined into a Jewish Welfare Board.

Following a merger of the Young Men's Hebrew Association, Young Women's Hebrew Association, and the Jewish Education Alliance, the organization was renamed Jewish Community Center (JCC) in 1951. Many member organizations adopted the new name, but some other member organizations did not do so, particularly in the New York metropolitan area, such as:

- In Manhattan, New York City, New York
  - Marlene Meyerson JCC Manhattan
  - YM & YWHA of Washington Heights & Inwood
  - 92nd Street Y, (formally, The Young Men's and Young Women's Hebrew Association, New York, New York)
  - 14th Street Y
- In Brooklyn, New York
  - Boro Park Y in Borough Park, (founded as YMHA)
  - Jewish Community House, or JCH, in Bensonhurst, Brooklyn
  - Kings Bay Y in Sheepshead Bay, with branches in northern Brooklyn
  - Shorefront Y
- Riverdale YM-YWHA in the Bronx, New York City, New York
- Samuel Field Y and Central Queens Y in Queens, New York (two agencies merging as of 2018)
- In New Jersey
  - Center for Jewish Life (CJL) in East Brunswick, successor to YM-YWHA of Raritan Valley in Highland Park (closed 2006)
  - YM-YWHA of Clifton/Passaic (name retained until its closing in 2011)
  - YM-YWHA of North Jersey in Wayne (name retained until sale to Metro YMCA in 2011)
- Jewish Community Alliance of Jacksonville, Florida

An example of the objectives of Jewish Community Centers can be seen within the New Bedford, Massachusetts branch's Constitution. In January 1947, the Jewish Community Center of New Bedford listed the following objectives:

- To foster and develop the highest values of Jewish spiritual and cultural life.
- To provide social, educational, literary, benevolent, recreational and athletic activities for the benefit of Jewish men, women, and children of New Bedford.
- To serve the spiritual, intellectual, social, and physical welfare of its members.
- To fulfill the great ideals of American citizenship.

== Services ==
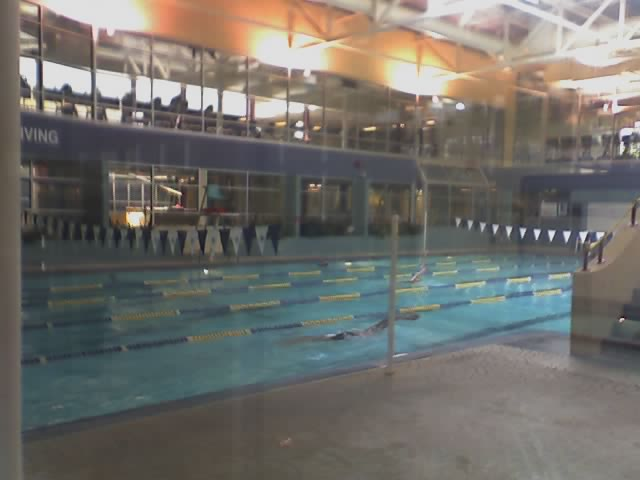
The indoor pool at the Rady Jewish Community Centre in Winnipeg, Manitoba

JCC Association offers a wide range of services and resources to help its affiliates to provide educational, cultural, social, Jewish identity-building, and recreational programs for people of all ages and backgrounds. JCC Association supports the largest network of Jewish early childhood centers and Jewish summer camps in North America and is also a U.S. government accredited agency for serving the religious and social needs of Jewish military personnel through JWB Jewish Chaplains Council.

Some JCCs provide services for people with disabilities, such as autism spectrum disorders and learning disabilities. In 2008, The Mandel JCC of Cleveland was awarded $652,500 in grant funding to be used for individuals with disabilities. Cleveland-area children and adults with emotional, physical and developmental disabilities now have many opportunities to get involved in fitness, wellness and recreational activities. Whenever possible, activities are inclusive and children are able to fully participate, usually with the assistance of an aide.

== Locations ==
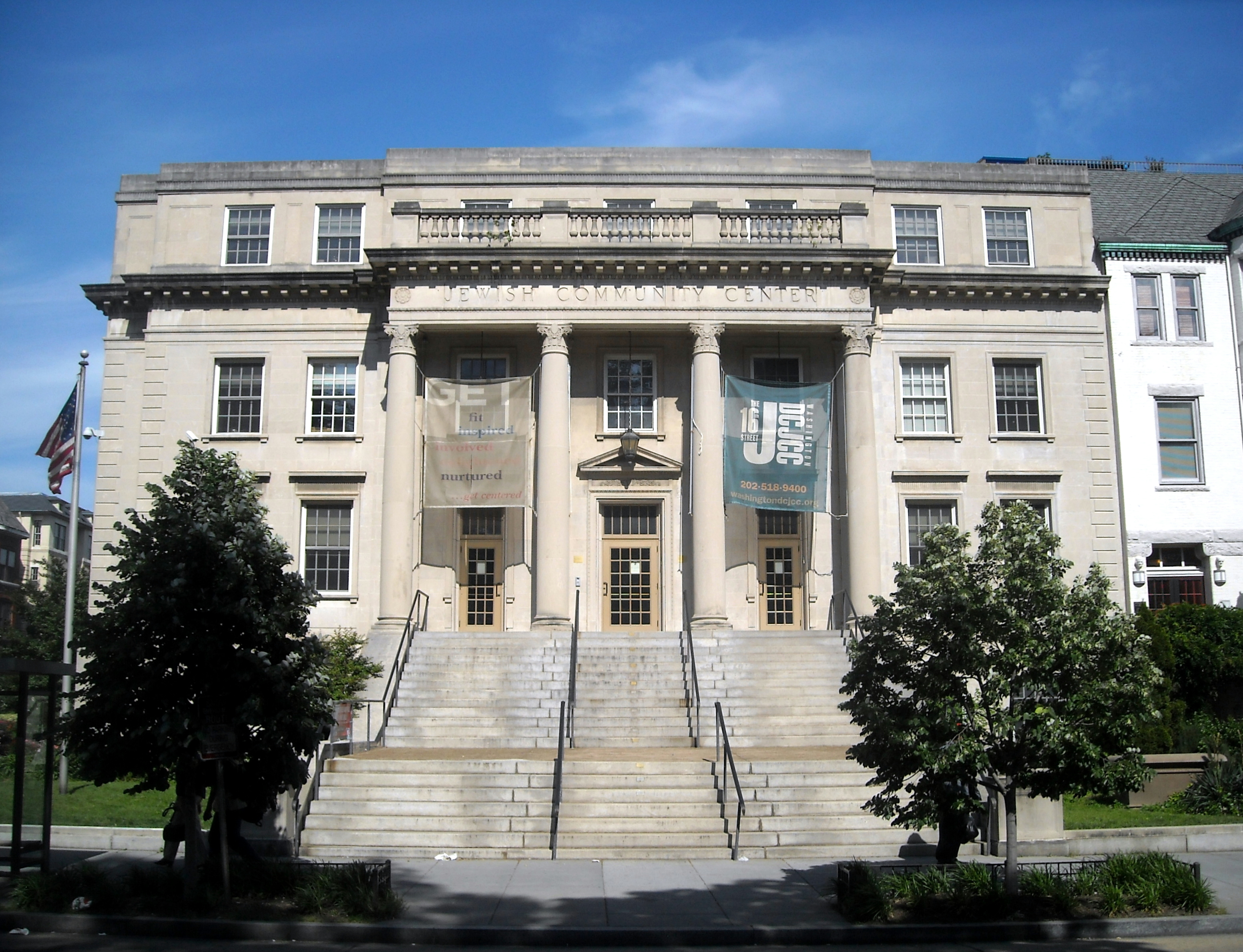
The Washington, D.C. Jewish Community Center (DCJCC) is located in the Dupont Circle neighborhood. President Calvin Coolidge spoke at the original ground-breaking ceremony on May 3, 1925. The Center closed in 1968, following race riots in Washington, D.C., later reopening in 1997.

There are nearly 150 JCCs across North America in 43 US states and Canadian provinces. The states with the most JCCs include New York with 37, California with nearly 20, and 13 in Florida and New Jersey. Almost all of the largest metropolitan areas in the U.S. now have at least one JCC, and many smaller communities also have locations. JCCs all over the country provide a wide range of social, cultural, and educational services, ranging from lectures, concerts, theater performances, and dance recitals to health and fitness classes, job training workshops, and citizenship classes.

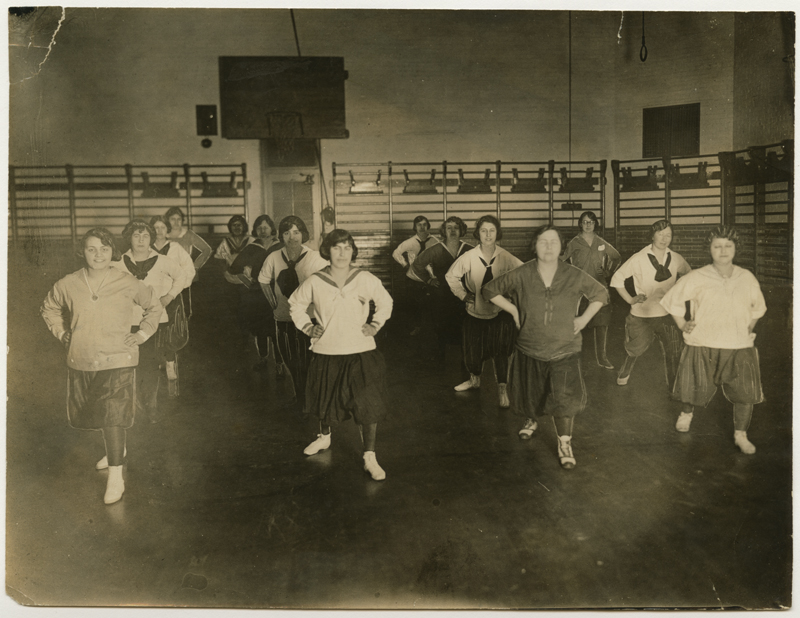
Hartford YWHA, gymnasium class, 1922–1923, Burr School gym

Their programs and activities vary by location. Particularly noteworthy is the JCC in West Bloomfield, Michigan, which is the largest JCC in North America, and possibly the world. The Holocaust Memorial Center, which attracts many visitors to its programs and exhibits, used to be a part of the JCC of West Bloomfield, but recently opened a building of its own. The West Bloomfield JCC houses two gymnasiums which can be made into three gyms using a movable wall, a workout area, an indoor full size and kiddie pool, an outdoor full size pool, a kosher restaurant, a Michigan Jewish war veterans museum, an in line hockey center, a library, ceramics/art rooms, a large multi-purpose room (Handleman Hall), an art museum, an area dedicated to teaching and learning about tzedakah (charity) called Shalom Street, a performing arts theater in the basement, a preschool, offices for summer camps, the previously mentioned preschool, and other administrative offices and organizations. The top floor is completely dedicated to The Jean and Samuel Frankel Jewish Academy of Metropolitan Detroit, a Jewish High School which opened in 2000. The JCC building is on the Eugene and Marcia Applebaum Jewish Community Campus along with multiple living quarters for the elderly and mentally disabled and an Alzheimer's treatment building.

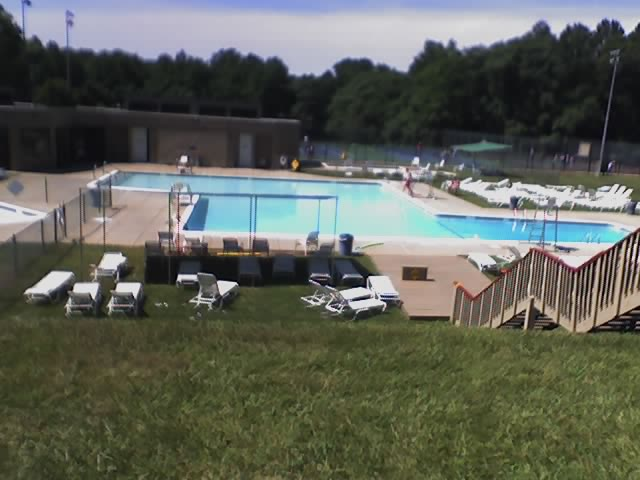
The main swimming pool at the Jewish Community Center in Owings Mills, Maryland

A significant addition to the family of JCCs in North America is the Marlene Meyerson JCC Manhattan. This eleven-story building situated in Manhattan's Upper West Side neighborhood opened its doors in the winter of 2002. The JCC offers a diversity of programs, from parenting to fitness and wellness, and each year the organization produces four week-long film festivals, an all-night Tikkun Leil Shavuot, a New Year's Day fitness fair, and an annual Symposium on Positive Aging. The JCC features multiple centers dedicated to segments of its community, including the Jack and Shirley Silver Center for Special Needs, the Bert and Sandra Wasserman Center for Family Life, the Selma and Lawrence Ruben Center for 20s + 30s, and the new Wechsler Center for Modern Aging, for those aged 60+.

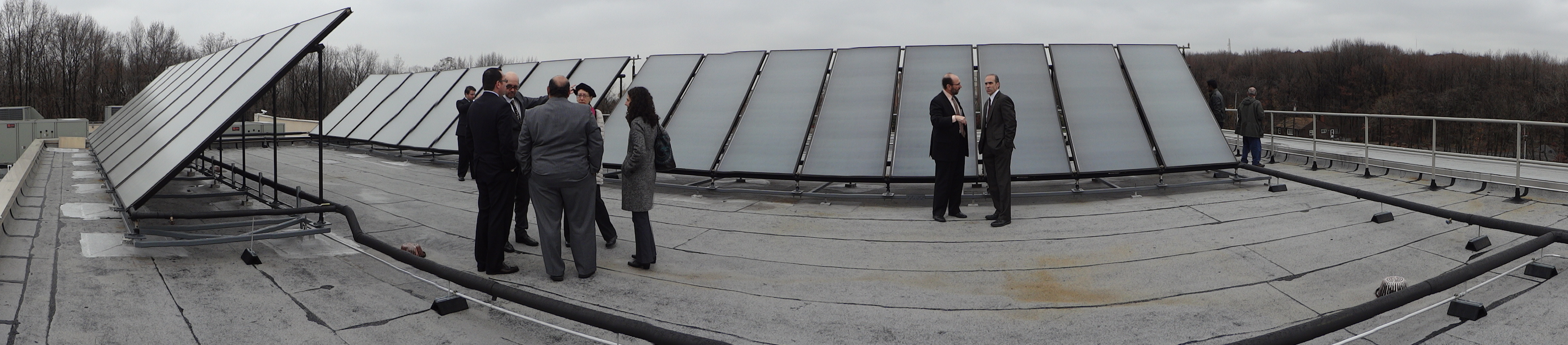
JCC of Staten Island solar panels

Solar thermal panels were installed at the Joan and Alan Bernikow JCC in Staten Island 2011.

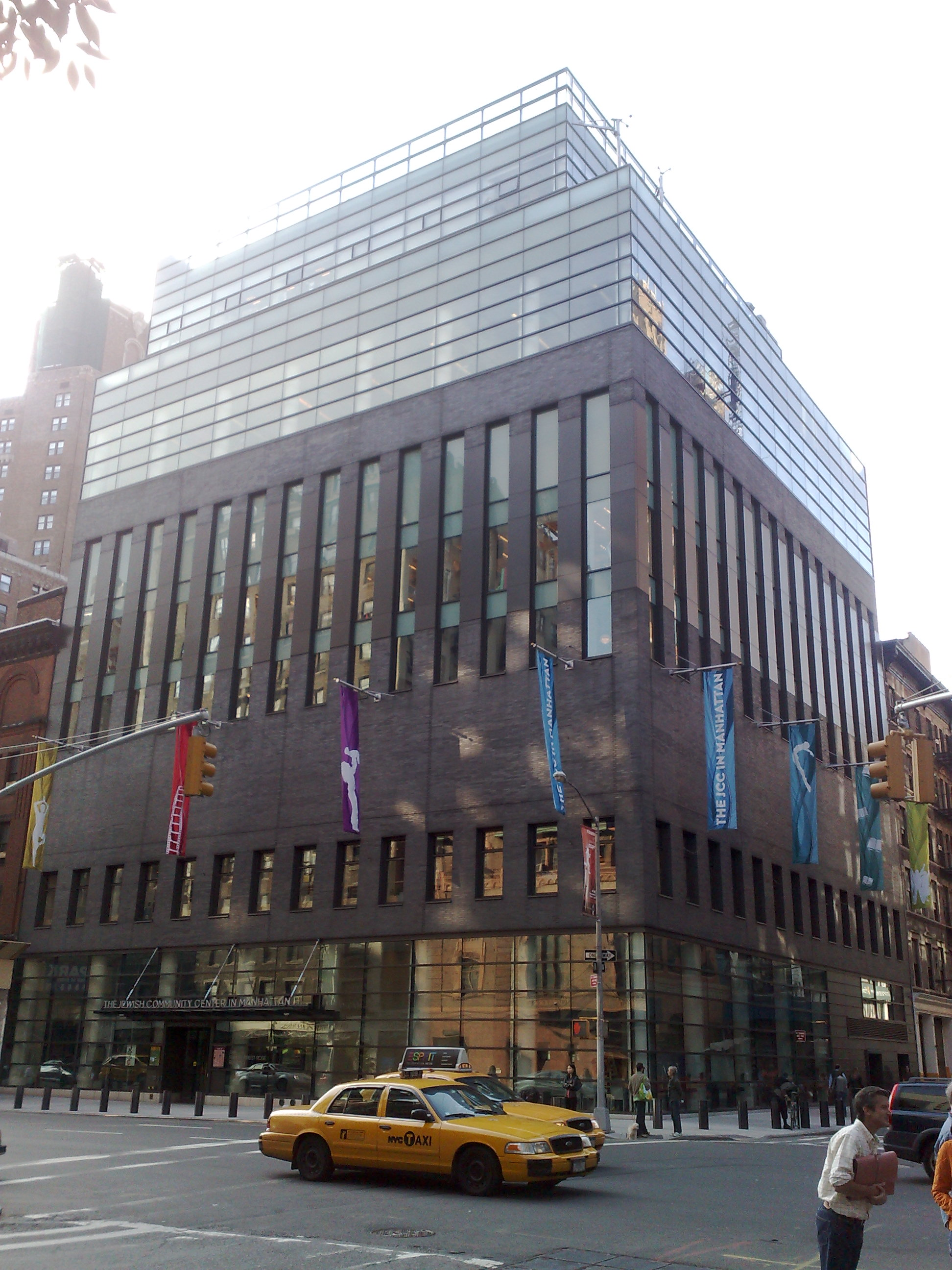
Marlene Meyerson JCC Manhattan

== Incidents and security ==
In recent decades, several incidents that have taken place at JCCs and other Jewish-related locations across the United States and Canada, as well as the September 11 attacks, have prompted JCCs in all areas to increase security at their facilities. Some of these events have included:

- As part of the 1950s synagogue bombings, the JCCs in Nashville, Tennessee, and Jacksonville, Florida, were bombed in 1958 by white supremacists opposed to Jewish support for integration in the southern United States. No one was hurt in the bombings.
- The 1994 AMIA bombing in Buenos Aires resulted in 85 deaths and over 300 injured persons.
- In 1997, a woman in Toronto was charged with kidnapping and other crimes in the unauthorized removal of her 5-year-old daughter from a JCC childcare center. The woman, a registered nurse who had previously lost custody of her child following a divorce, led police on a high-speed chase and crashed, causing minor injuries to both.
- In the Los Angeles Jewish Community Center shooting on August 10, 1999, a white supremacist opened fire and wounded four children and one adult, who all survived. The shooter was later convicted of homicide in a separate incident.
- In the Seattle Jewish Federation shooting on July 29, 2006, one person was killed when a Muslim man named Naveed Afzal Haq opened fire. This shooting was in response to the offender's anger at the United States for the Iraq War and its support for Israel.
- In the Overland Park Jewish Community Center shooting on April 13, 2014, a white supremacist opened fire in the parking lot of the JCC of Greater Kansas City in Overland Park, Kansas, and at a nearby Jewish retirement home. Three were killed in the incident and two others were shot at but were unharmed.
- Starting in 2017, over 100 JCCs received bomb threats, along with other Jewish buildings such as schools. By March, two suspects were arrested: Juan M. Thompson, an African-American former journalist who was attempting to frame his ex-girlfriend for making antisemitic threats; and Michael Ron David Kadar, a mentally ill 18-year-old Israeli-American man. who in April 2017 was charged in an Israeli court with several crimes including an attempt to extort a United States senator, "publishing false reports causing public panic, conspiring to commit a crime, hacking computers to commit a crime, and violations of money-laundering laws". The indictment alleged that he threatened "2,000 different institutions around the world, including the Israeli embassy in Washington, the Israeli consulate in Miami, schools, malls, police stations, hospitals and airlines." In the same month he faced a similar indictment in a Florida court which included 28 crimes.

== Notable members ==
- Tal Brody (born 1943), was drafted #12 in the NBA draft but opted to play for Israel, began playing basketball at the Trenton JCC.
- Jake Cohen (born 1990), plays basketball for Maccabi Tel Aviv, played for the Philadelphia JCC team which won a gold medal at the 2007 JCC Maccabi Games. He scored 33 points in the finals.
- Ross Friedman (born 1992), Major League Soccer player
- Cullen Jones, Olympic gold medalist in swimming, was a childhood member of Metro Express, a swim team at the JCC MetroWest in West Orange, NJ.
- Sandy Koufax (born 1935), Baseball Hall of Fame pitcher, played basketball at the Edith and Carl Marks Jewish Community House of Bensonhurst as a teenager.
- Ingrid Michaelson (born 1979), indie-pop singer-songwriter. Student of the JCC of Staten Island's Dorothy Delson Kuhn Music Institute.
- Bruno Sammartino, former two-time WWF (now WWE) champion. It was at a YMHA in Pittsburgh that he discovered weightlifting.
- Daniel Steres (born 1990), professional soccer player with the LA Galaxy, was a three-time JCC Maccabi Championship Team member.
- Ruth Westheimer (1928-2024), the sex therapist and talk-show host, served as the president of the YM & YWHA of Washington Heights & Inwood in New York City.
- Jerry Stiller (1927-2020), American comedian and actor, was a member of JCC Manhattan

== See also ==
- Prosserman Jewish Community Centre (Toronto, Canada)
- Miles Nadal Jewish Community Centre (downtown Toronto)
- JW3 (London, UK)
- Jewish Center (disambiguation)
