= 2005 Brisbane bomb hoax =

Series of bomb threats in Brisbane, Australia

Coordinates: 27.470°S 153.025°E

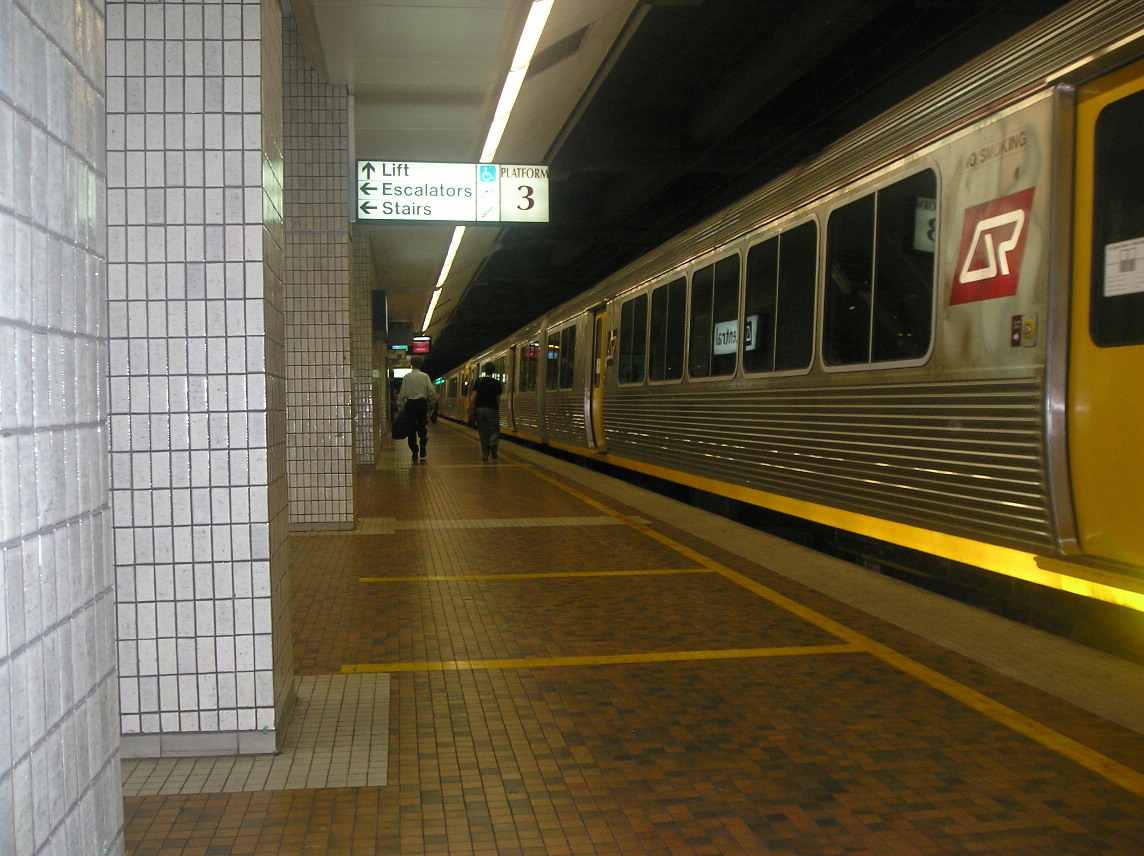
Brisbane's Central railway station in 2005

The 2005 Brisbane bomb hoax involved several bomb threats that were made to police in Brisbane, Queensland, Australia on 14 and 15 November 2005. The threats resulted in the halting of public transport services throughout the city.

== Threats ==
On 14 November 2005, three calls were made to police warning of bombs on buses and trains in Brisbane. All bus and train services in the city were evacuated at 12:00 pm and again at 4:45 pm. The shutdowns caused major problems for the thousands of people who relied on the services.

At 7.32 am on 15 November, another call was made to police telling them to remain vigilant and "keep their eye on the ball." Each of the four calls had been made from different a payphone in suburban Brisbane.

== Aftermath ==
On the night of 15 November, Rodney Bruce Watson, a 46-year-old truck driver from Munruben, was arrested and charged with four counts of making bomb threats. Police reported that his fingerprints had been found on three of the four payphones used to make the bomb threats, although Watson's lawyer said Watson claimed he had not "been to a phone box in years."

Watson appeared in the Brisbane Magistrates Court on 16 November. He did not enter a plea and made an application for bail. The bail hearing was adjourned, pending a psychiatric report on Watson, and he was remanded in custody. Watson reportedly said to police that he had been "inspired by the recent arrests of terrorist suspects in southern states," and he subsequently had two applications for bail denied on the basis that there was a risk that he would reoffend.

On 7 March 2006, Watson pleaded guilty to four counts of making a bomb threat, and on 28 July was sentenced to three years in prison, to be suspended after 12 months, followed by a supervision period of three years. With time already served this meant Watson was released from prison in November 2006.

== See also ==
- Bomb threat
