= Bomb threat =

Threat to detonate an explosive device

A bomb threat or bomb scare is a threat, usually verbal or written, to detonate an explosive or incendiary device to cause property damage, death, injuries, and/or incite fear, whether or not such a device actually exists.

== History ==
=== Civil Rights Movement ===
Bomb threats were used to incite fear and violence during the American Civil Rights Movement, during which a notable leader of the movement, Martin Luther King Jr., received multiple bomb threats during public addresses. Further, schools, such as the Central High School in Arkansas, received many bomb threats after desegregating their classes.

== Motivations ==
Reported motives for bomb threats include: "humor, self assertion, anger, manipulation, aggression, hate and devaluation, omnipotence, fantasy, and psychotic distortion, ideology, retaliation," and creating chaos. Many of the motives based on personal emotion are speculative. Bomb threats that aren’t intended to be pranks are often made as parts of other crimes, such as extortion, arson, or aircraft hijacking. Actual bombings for malicious destruction of property, terrorism, or murder are often perpetrated without warning.

=== Ideological ===
Bomb threats may be motivated by political, religious, and ideological differences. These include but are not limited to political issues, abortion, animal testing, eco-terrorism, and use of nuclear power. The aim of these threats is to draw attention to certain causes or incite fear and unrest among those who support said causes. Some threats are racially motivated, while others are made against houses of worship or research and medical facilities.

=== Extortion ===
Bomb threats made as part of extortion schemes demand some form of bribe, payment, or incentive to prevent the use of a bomb. The payment can be made in the form of cash, Bitcoin, or forcing the victim to adhere to demands.

=== Hoax device ===
A hoax device has the appearance of a destructive device or biological weapon, and is intended to cause a reasonable person to assume the item was a truly destructive device capable of causing injury or death. Because of the potential for loss of life, injury, and property damage of a bomb detonation, bomb threats are treated as realistic and maliciously intended by authorities until proven otherwise. False bomb reports cause serious disruption, often leading to the disruption of business and costly police response. These threats are especially common in schools, and may be made as distractions or disruptions, forcing school officials to cancel or postpone planned activities such as exams.

=== False flag ===
False flag bomb threats are made to create the appearance of a specific group or person being responsible for an activity to disguise the true perpetrators.

=== Political ===
Bomb threats can be part of politically motivated operations, sometimes being used as a method of threatening or creating a dangerous situation for opposing political members.

== Targets ==
=== Schools and universities ===
Bomb threats are often made toward educational institutions. They are typically by students who are overwhelmed by academic pressure, are resentful of the school, and/or are acting on violent impulses. Their frustration may be aimed at specific groups or individuals that are part of the school’s community. During 1999— which was the most recent year with publicly published data as of 2005— roughly 5% of bomb threats made in the United States targeted schools. Over a decade later bomb threats against schools saw a 33% increase of while threats against residences decreased by 35% between 2014 and 2016. Perpetrators of false bomb threats face severe consequences, often facing expulsion.

=== Public figures ===
Bomb threats against political figures such as the President of the United States, occur regularly and are illegal under the United States Code Title 18, Section 871 law.

The British royal family, specifically Queen Elizabeth, has faced bomb threats as a reaction to policies of the British government. Celebrities may also be the victims of bomb threats, especially those who have expressed political views, or those who are leaders of political causes. Author Salman Rushdie and his publisher faced multiple bomb threats from Islamic fundamentalist groups because of his controversial book The Satanic Verses, which was interpreted by these groups as opposing Muslim ideology.

=== Government and public infrastructure ===
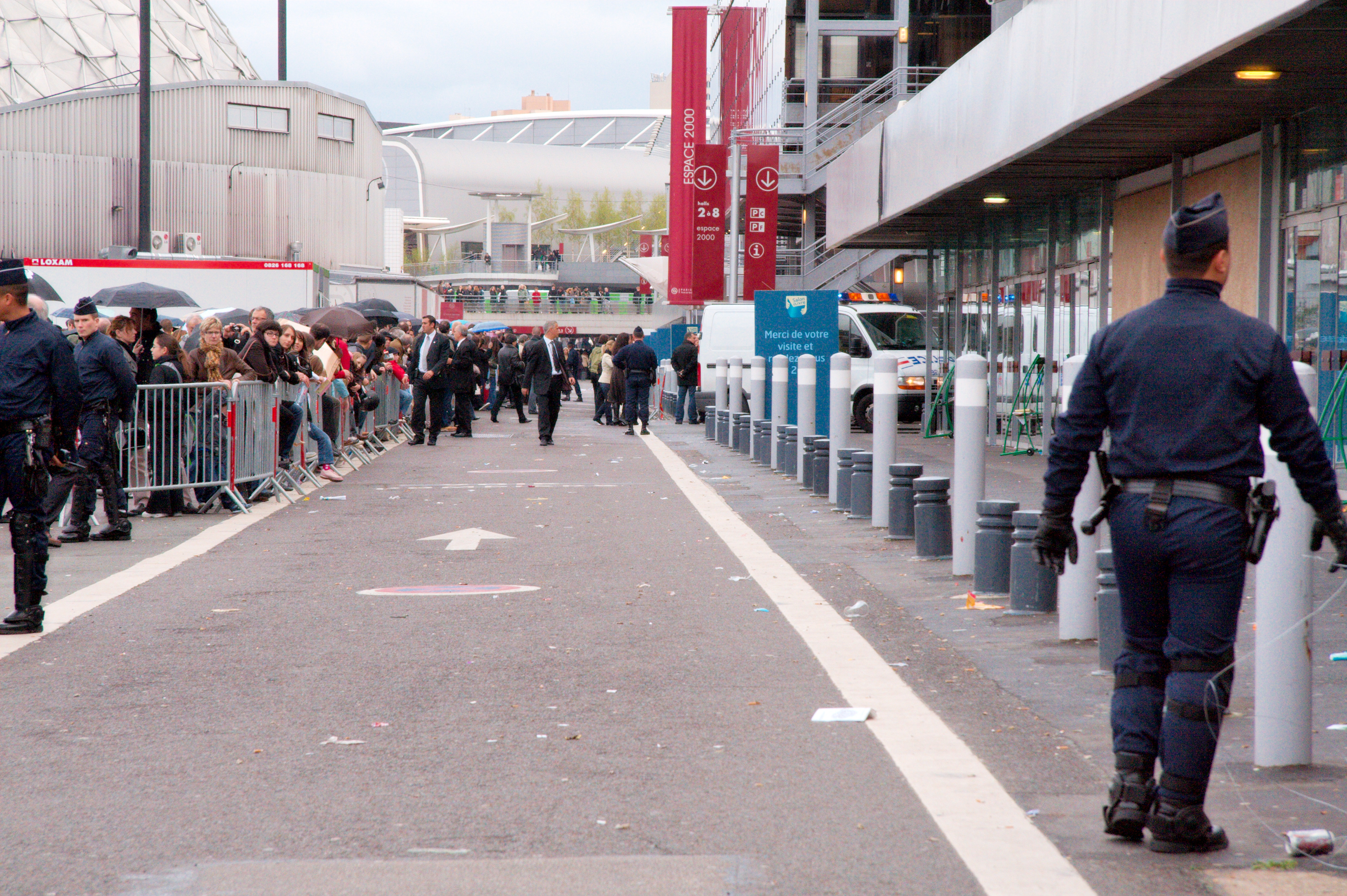
Evacuation of the Paris Expo Porte de Versailles during the 2008 Salon du livre de Paris, after a bomb threat

Many buildings are the recipients of bomb threats, including transportation hubs such as airports and train stations, power plants, medical facilities, and government buildings such as the Pentagon, US embassies and the Casa Rosada. Among these, airports, city halls, and courthouses are most likely to experience repeated bomb threats. Among bomb threats related to transportation, threats and false information knowingly provided about bombs on airplanes have the most severe response.

=== Private institutions and businesses ===
Private institutions and businesses, including as banks, department stores, malls, casinos, restaurants, manufacturing plants, and truck stops, have been the recipients of bomb threats for various reasons. Some bomb threats are made because of ideological differences or opposition to the mission or perceived mission of the institution, such as those made against Planned Parenthood and abortion clinics, news organizations such as CNN, or nuclear facilities. From 1983 to 1992, the World Trade Center experienced roughly 350 bomb threats and scares for various reasons.

Some threats are motivated by money, involving an offender demanding a payoff from a bank or department store over a public phone. Other reasons for attacking a restaurant or shopping center include revenge or vandalism, the primary motives found in a study analyzing 69 Finnish offenders.

== Methods ==
A majority of bomb threats are perpetrated by middle-aged men who make these threats via a telephone call. Different types of offenders tend to call the target directly on a public phone to demand money, call directly on a personal line because of resentment, or call emergency service lines and make threats for personal entertainment.

Bomb threats may also be made by text message, as in the case of a March 2004 message to a private operator sending a warning of bombs in five Washington, D.C. schools, and February 2014 messages to school employees of Ateneo de Manila University.

Bomb threats may be made in letters or notes, delivered either personally or through the mail system. Packages intended to mimic or represent bombs, including backpacks, luggage, bags, or attache cases, even if they may not have the capability of exploding because of poor construction or intentional choices, are still treated as potential explosives, as in the case of 13 devices mailed to various politicians and opponents of then-US President Donald Trump.

Electronic bomb threats may be made over websites, email, or social media, as in the case of the emailed wave of 2018 Bitcoin bomb threats in the United States and Canada. A series of mail bombs sent to celebrities based on their political ideologies was found to have been preceded by threats on Twitter.

They can also be made face-to-face.

=== Indirect threats ===
Many activities treated as bomb threats do not explicitly state an intent to set off an explosive; nevertheless, they convey through context or action that a threat is being made. Some actions may indicate an intent to bomb, such as parking a truck outside an abortion clinic, after a similar bombing made by the same vehicle. In other scenarios, a message mentioning bombs may be interpreted as a threat based on context, such as an email to a school principal reading "bomb," a statement that a bomb exists in a specific location, the expression of a desire to build a bomb, a description of a bomb that was placed, or other communications.

== Credibility and response ==
Most bomb threats are false alarms which do not involve actual explosives, only the incitement of fear. There are more bomb threats than incidents, with only 14 of 1,055 school incidents recorded from 1990 to 2002 being preceded by threats. According to the Hunter-Howler threat dynamic, the group of people who make bomb threats is largely separate from those who attempt a real bombing, which typically occurs without warning.

Standard procedure is usually to take all threats seriously because civilians are usually threatened by them if valid as well as the community, and arrests may be made even for bomb threats made falsely as in most jurisdictions even hoaxes are a crime. Signs that a threat is legitimate include an out-of-place object found, a motive or specific targets being stated, and multiple calls or specific threats being made.

Police and bomb disposal professionals are typically alerted to respond to bomb threat incidents to assess and mitigate potential harm. Schools and government organizations offer instructions and sometimes training for both bomb prevention planning and response to assist those facing bomb threats. Organizations involved in responding to a bomb threat may also include anti-terrorism government agencies, fire departments, and other emergency services.

The decision to evacuate an area or building, depending on the perceived reliability of the threat, may be made by local controlling authorities or those in charge of the targeted facility based on advice from bomb disposal experts. When a large facility is involved, it can be very difficult and time-consuming to ensure the absence of any bomb or other hazardous device or substance. A search is conducted for out-of-place packages that have features such as unusual shapes, sounds, smells, leakage, or electrical components. Bomb-sniffing dogs may be used as part of this search. Forensic evidence and law enforcement searches are then used to attempt to locate the perpetrator.

=== Law ===
While the terms "bomb threat" and "bomb scare" are often used interchangeably, a bomb threat in the legal context is typically in the form of a statement, or some "communicated intent to inflict harm," whereas a "bomb scare" refers to situations of imminent risk, such as the discovery of a suspicious bag. These are both distinct from false statements knowingly made about bombs, which are sometimes also criminalized.

Some statutory definitions include the threatened use, release or placement of other harmful agents, such as poisons, biological pathogens, radioactive materials, or even a dangerous weapon (e.g., aboard an airliner). Other statutes enhance the penalties for threats made against specific places or persons (e.g. government facilities or dignitaries), and the actual possession of harmful devices or agents. Prosecution of making a bomb threat hinges only on the victim's reasonable belief of the threat's veracity rather than the actual existence of a dangerous device.

==== United States ====
A total of 1536 bomb threat incidents took place in the US in 2016, 254 of which were made against businesses and 186 of which were made to residences. Criminal statutes typically dictate severe penalties. For example, in the United States, Massachusetts provides for penalties of up to 20 years in prison, up to $50,000 fine, and restitution for the costs of the disruption. New York law makes it a "Class E Felony ... to issue a false bomb threat directed toward a school in New York State." Even a false bomb threat has a maximum fine of $5,000 and up to 5 years in prison. In Orange County in North Carolina, a person may face "a felony charge, a 365-day suspension, revocation of his or her driver’s license, and a civil lawsuit of up to $25,000."

The current federal law regarding bomb threats applies to a person who "threatens by any means the placement or setting of a weapon of mass destruction." Although there is some contention as to whether the law is overly broad, some current statutes making bomb threats illegal do not define a "threat," as a "true threat", meaning that the intent to use an actual bomb, the existence of a target, or the ability to convince the recipient that a bomb exists, is not relevant. This is because verbal acts which inherently cause panic are not protected under Freedom of speech. However, other sentencing guidelines apply only to "defendants whose conduct evidenced an intent to carry out the threat".

=== Society ===
Bomb threats are likely influenced by the power of suggestion and mass media, with threats likely to be made against targets with recent media coverage. Analysis suggests bomb threats against nuclear energy facilities tend to follow greater publicity of nuclear power problems. In the 6 months after the 1999 Columbine High School massacre, there were a reported 5,000 bomb threats made against schools, with hundreds more made every year. Before 1999, there were roughly 1 to 2 threats a year, but by May 1999 a Gallup poll showed one fifth of teenage students experiencing a bomb threat evacuation. Because of copycat trends, some schools are moving toward policies of immediate criminal action against students caught making such threats, regardless of motivation. In addition, the FBI has created a campaign, namely “#ThinkBeforeYouPost”, and warns students not to post or send any threats against a school online.

== Notable incidents ==
=== Harvard University finals ===
On December 16, 2013 at approximately 8:30 a.m. the final exams at Harvard University were disrupted by several anonymous emails threatening to plant shrapnel bombs at various locations on the campus. The FBI charged Eldo Kim, a sophomore at Harvard, for the false bomb threats on the following day.

Kim agreed to take responsibility for his attempt to cancel the fall 2013 final exams on November 19th, 2014. Following his legal agreement, he agreed to publish his confession in The Harvard Crimson on November 25th, pay restitution to law enforcement agencies, complete a rehabilitative "diversionary program", remain under house arrest for four months, and perform 750 hours of community service.

=== Raman Pratasevich arrest ===
The Belarusian government reportedly used a bomb threat as a pretext to divert Ryanair Flight 4978 to Minsk to arrest Raman Pratasevich, an oppositional figure. As a result the nation was accused of committing state terrorism.

- 2006 NFL bomb threat hoax
- 2012 University of Pittsburgh bomb threats
- 2016 Australian school bomb threats
- 2017 Jewish Community Center bomb threats
- October 2018 United States mail bombing attempts
- 2018 Bitcoin bomb threats
- 2021 Ryanair Flight 4978 bomb threat hoax
- 2026 European airline bomb threats

== See also ==
- Threat
- Bomb
- Death threat
- Swatting
