= FTI =

FTI may refer to:

- FAA Telecommunications Infrastructure, air control system
- FTI (Western Australia), the Film and Television Institute in Western Australia, Australia
- Fair Trials International, a British human rights organization
- Farnesyltransferase inhibitor, a class of cancer drugs
- Federation of Thai Industries
- Fellow of the Tax Institute
- First to invent
- Fitiuta Airport, in American Samoa
- Flanders Technology International Foundation
- Flight test instrumentation
- Food Terminal Incorporated, an industrial complex in the Philippines
- Foundation for Tolerance International, a Kyrgyz peace organization
- Free thyroxine index
- Frégates de taille intermédiaire, a class of frigates of the French Navy
- F.T. Island, a South Korean pop-rock band
- FTI Consulting, an American business advisory firm
- FTI railway station, in the Philippines
- Futian railway station (Guangdong), China Railway pinyin code FTI
- FTI, a Brazilian research rocket made by Fogtrein
