= 2026 FAA nationwide ground stop =

Halt in air traffic across the United States

- The FAA advisory ordering the ground stop
- Date: November 13, 2026
- Time: 20:54 – 01:19 (UTC)
- Duration: 4 hours and 25 minutes
- Location: United States
- Type: Nationwide ground stop
- Cause: Communication issues involving area control centers

On November 13, 2026, the Federal Aviation Administration (FAA) issued a nationwide ground stop when a communications failure reported in the Chicago area was found to be affecting multiple control centers across the National Airspace System. It lasted four and a half hours, issued at 20:54 UTC and lifted at 01:15 UTC the following day. Similar to the 2023 FAA system outage, flights in the air were allowed to continue to their destination and some flights were allowed to depart on a case-by-case basis, but nearly 3,500 scheduled flights were not permitted to take off until the source of the disruption was identified and resolved.

As of November 17, 2026, the root cause is still under investigation, but according to Sean Duffy, the United States secretary of transportation, one of their newly installed routers began sending a thousand connection attempts every four to five seconds across the FTI network, disrupting aircraft communication and radar feeds at seventeen separate ARTCCs. In the hours following the event, two separate communication facilities that recently converted from coaxial cables to optical fiber were isolated as a potential source of the disruption. Disabling the broadcasting function of the routers at these two sites proved effective, and in the days following approximately sixty other similar routers across the system had the same function disabled.

== Background ==
The FAA long received warnings from aviation experts about the antiquated state of US air traffic infrastructure. Two months before the ground stop, a Government Accountability Office report highlighted the dangers posed by the antiquated infrastructure. At San Diego International Airport several years previously, a printer used to produce paper flight strips jammed; as controllers tried to fix it, two planes nearly collided. The report found that the FAA was not properly supervising contractors' work, was not effectively coordinating upgrade activities, and was not receiving sufficient funds from the US government.

The US air traffic control infrastructure has fallen significantly behind that of first-world countries. The copper wire system dates back to the 1960s, and the FAA sources spare parts for its legacy systems from online resale platforms such as eBay. The US has taken 25 years so far in its quest to replace copper wire with optical fiber, whereas in Canada, the process has been largely completed in only 18 months.

== Timeline ==
20:00 UTC = 3:00 PM EST

- 20:21: ATC advises all aircraft inbound to Chicago O'Hare International Airport to expect up to thirty minutes holding on arrival.
- 20:28: Ground stop issued for all O'Hare arrivals due to "comms issues".
- 20:31: Ground stop issued for all Chicago Midway arrivals.
- 20:54: National Airspace System closed until 04:00 UTC due to "extraordinary circumstances and for reasons of safety".
- 21:21: Flight plan drop times for all centers extended to four hours due to "nationwide comms failure".
- 22:20: Ground stop issued for all Toronto arrivals from the United States.
- 22:30: Ground stop issued for all Montreal arrivals from the United States.
- 22:46: ATC begins allowing some flights to depart on a case-by-case basis, but the ground stop is not lifted.
- 23:00: United Airlines 871 is one of the first flights cleared from the western United States toward Asia.
- 23:06: Nav Canada lifts Montreal and Toronto ground stops.
- 23:30: British Airways 9HL is one of the first flights cleared from the eastern United States toward Europe.
- 01:19: National ground stop is lifted.

== Effects ==
Aircraft queued on a taxiway at O'Hare International Airport during the ground stop

Passengers viewing a JFK Airport departure board during the outage

Passengers wait in line to refund or rebook their flights

The ground stop halted departures from airports in the United States. Domestic flights that were already airborne at the time of the advisory were allowed to fly to their planned destination, while international flights were handled "on a case-by-case basis" once they approached the US, per the FAA. Gates at major airports soon filled up, necessitating some incoming planes to be diverted to smaller nearby airports. US-bound departures from Europe were suspended from 22:00 to 05:00 UTC. In Mexico, the Federal Civil Aviation Agency (AFAC) asked that all US-bound aircraft at Mexican airports remain on the ground until US authorities allowed flights to resume.

The ground stop caused nearly 8,000 cancellations and more than 10,000 flights to be delayed across the United States, including cargo flights. The outage also affected international flights that transited United States airspace, including the heavy seasonal air traffic between Canada and Mexico, the Caribbean and Central America. During the outage, the passenger rail service Amtrak reported higher-than-normal phone and web page traffic as stranded airline passengers sought alternatives.

Several National Basketball Association, National Hockey League, National Football League, and college football teams were forced to change their travel plans—taking buses or later flights—in order to reach their weekend games. Transportation Secretary Sean Duffy specifically advised football teams, many of which travel on charter flights, to "reach out to the FAA". Professional wrestling promotions All Elite Wrestling (AEW) and Total Nonstop Action Wrestling (TNA) had their pay-per-view events slightly affected for the weekend; AEW's Full Gear on the 14th in Phoenix, Arizona was able to proceed with only minor changes to the event's pre-show; whereas TNA's Destination X on the 15th in Edmonton, Alberta, Canada, had several matches on the main card affected.

A group of NFL officials worked two games on November 15, becoming the first group in NFL history to do so on the same day. They first worked an afternoon game between the Miami Dolphins and Indianapolis Colts, then later worked a primetime game between the Pittsburgh Steelers and Cincinnati Bengals.

Flights between the United Kingdom and the United States were also affected by the disruption. On the morning of November 14, 29 flights between London Heathrow Airport and the United States had been cancelled, while a further 19 departing flights from Heathrow were delayed. At London Gatwick Airport, three incoming flights from Orlando were also cancelled. The UK Civil Aviation Authority warned that disruption could continue as airlines rebooked affected passengers. Manchester Airport, however, said it did not expect significant delays, while Gatwick Airport anticipated only limited disruption.

=== Flights permitted to depart ===
Flights within Alaska and within Hawaii were permitted to depart, as were non-US-mainland flights out of Hawaii.

Two hours after the advisory was issued, at 15:00 PST, Pacific-bound flights from San Francisco International Airport, including to Hawaii and Asia, were cleared to depart. Some trans-Atlantic flights from the East Coast were also allowed to depart. SpaceX was able to launch Starship flight 15 as planned, as the FAA had issued an airspace restriction around the Texas launch site prior to the outage.

Although the nationwide ground stop was lifted on Friday evening, its effects continued into Saturday, November 14, when more than 2,500 additional flights were canceled and hundreds more were delayed as airlines worked to restore normal operations. Passengers continued to face disruptions, with some having to make alternative travel and accommodation arrangements. The Associated Press reported that the effects of the shutdown could continue for several days.

Flight disruptions continued for a third consecutive day on November 15, with more than 11,500 flights across the United States canceled or delayed, according to FlightAware. The total included approximately 2,100 cancellations and 9,400 delays. Transportation Secretary Sean Duffy said he expected airline operations to return to normal by Monday, as carriers worked to restore their schedules.

At the request of the FAA, flights from the 42 Eurocontrol member states to the US were suspended amid technical problems affecting air traffic control communications. The suspension applied to departures scheduled between 22:00 UTC on November 13 and 05:00 UTC on November 14.

== Cause ==
Telecommunications problems with some radio communication frequencies and radar feeds occurred at 17 of 22 — initially reported as "all" — Air Route Traffic Control Centers, as well as several terminal radar approach control facilities. Problems were noticed with radio frequencies hours before the advisory. In an early account on November 13, CBS News reported that "[a]n update to the private communications network that connects America's air traffic control system caused the system to reboot, leading to a crash and a communications outage".

At a White House briefing that evening, Homeland Security Secretary Markwayne Mullin said that new FAA equipment and technology appeared to have overwhelmed older systems. Transportation Secretary Sean Duffy said network switches and routers had become overloaded with data, producing inconsistent information. Mullin stated there was no indication of a "nefarious attack".

Early on Saturday November 14, the Wall Street Journal reported a possible connection between the disruption and work by L3Harris Technologies, the contractor that owns, operates, and maintains the Federal Aviation Administration Telecommunications Infrastructure (FTI). According to the FAA, L3Harris had been gradually replacing Cisco 600 routers on the FTI network with newer routers from Juniper Networks (owned by Hewlett Packard Enterprise since 2025). The router swaps are connected to L3Harris's "routine maintenance" activities in switching communications infrastructure from copper wire to optical fiber, with roughly 70% of the years-long conversion from copper to fiber already completed. According to Sean Duffy and the FAA, a newly installed Juniper router at a radio communications facility in El Dorado, Arkansas began flooding the network with a thousand connection attempts every few seconds, which overloaded other, older routers. A second router, installed a few weeks earlier at an Amarillo, Texas radar facility, also contributed to the overload. According to an account in Wired, the problems began when some radio frequencies at area control centers from Kansas City to Chicago began to drop out, then the dropouts cascaded to other regions including Washington, DC and New York. Transportation Secretary Duffy said investigators had recreated the El Dorado incident, but the root cause of what happened had not been determined.

=== Non-related outages ===
Reuters claimed that the National Weather Service had experienced a nationwide radar outage and telecommunication issues, but the NWS Twitter account stated this was the result of outdated static webpages and unrelated to the FAA outage. One regional NWS office reportedly confirmed a regional outage affecting weather radios, but denied there had been a national or radar outage.

On November 12, 2026, Microsoft experienced a global outage that continued into the morning of the same day as the FAA outage. When questioned by reporters, this was also dismissed as unrelated by Mullin.

A departure board for Toronto Pearson International Airport, showing the cancellation of many flights bound for the US. Domestic Canadian flights were largely unaffected.

No Canadian systems were affected by the outage; Nav Canada offered support for diverted planes during the ground stop. Domestic operations for Canadian airlines including Air Canada and WestJet were largely unaffected; significant disruptions occurred on flights to and from the US, however, as well as those that required only crossing US airspace.

On November 10, 2026, the FAA expanded an artificial intelligence (AI) air traffic management system, Strategic Management of Airspace, Routes and Trajectories (SMART), to all air centers. The FAA has denied this rollout as being a cause for the ground stop. Aviation experts Margaret Wallace and Walter Bayleaf agree it is likely unrelated. Markwayne Mullin, the Secretary of the Department of Homeland Security (DHS) had not ruled it out when initially addressing the press at the White House. Its developer, Air Space Intelligence, denied that the technology had caused the disruption.

== Aftermath ==
Homeland Security Secretary Markwayne Mullin and Transportation Secretary Sean Duffy speaking to reporters about the ground stop on November 13, 2026

Following the ground stop, Mullin and Duffy requested US$50 billion from Congress in order to overhaul the national air traffic control system. Duffy had previously lobbied Congress for $30 billion in funding on November 12, one day before the ground stop.

Due to the ground stop, Amtrak saw increased demand and cascading system issues for train passengers booking replacement transportation.

Flight disruptions stretched into a third consecutive day on November 15. More than 11,500 flights were canceled or delayed across the United States.

In an interview with NBC's Meet the Press, Duffy was asked whether he would apologize to the American people for the widespread air traffic disruption. He replied, "I can't apologize for what was passed off to us, and I can't blame Republicans or Democrats because it's all of them."

== Reactions ==
Transportation Secretary Sean Duffy attributed the disruption to overloaded switches and routers in the Federal Aviation Administration's (FAA) aging air traffic control system. He said the immediate problem had been resolved but called on Congress to provide an additional $50 billion to modernize the infrastructure, in addition to $12.5 billion already approved. Homeland Security Secretary Markwayne Mullin said there was no evidence of a cyberattack or deliberate foreign interference and that more than 3,000 aircraft had landed safely during the disruption. Although Duffy demanded $50 billion from Congress, critics noted that as a Congressperson in 2019 he voted against $10 billion in FAA funding.

On November 15, President Trump posted on Truth Social blaming the Biden administration for the failure, and asked Congress to fund a new air traffic control (ATC) system.

Several Democratic lawmakers called for an investigation into the failure. Representative Ted Lieu described the telecommunications outage as unacceptable and called for congressional hearings, while Senator Tammy Duckworth demanded answers from the FAA and a thorough investigation into the incident. Representative James Walkinshaw, member of the House Oversight Committee, said that Duffy must be questioned by Congress, "Because I watched him in that press conference Friday night, and he was not being truthful with the American people." He also pointed out that the work was being conducted "on a busy travel day, as opposed to in the middle of the night where a disruption wouldn’t have been so damaging because they’re rushing."

The Air Line Pilots Association said it was monitoring the situation in coordination with the FAA and the National Air Traffic Controllers Association. Airlines warned that delays and cancellations would continue after the ground stop was lifted as they worked to reposition aircraft and crews. According to Reuters, thousands of flights were cancelled, with the disruption expected to affect airline operations for several days.

== See also ==
- 2024 CrowdStrike-related IT outages § Air transport
- Closings and cancellations following the September 11 attacks § North American airspace
- November 2026 technology outages
