= Strategic Management of Airspace, Routes and Trajectories =

Artificial intelligence air traffic control system by FAA

Strategic Management of Airspace, Routes and Trajectories (SMART) is an air traffic control planning system deployed by the Federal Aviation Administration (FAA) in the United States that uses artificial intelligence to forecast traffic conditions and recommend changes to flight departure times and routes.

== Development ==
SMART is being developed by Air Space Intelligence (ASI), a Silicon Valley start-up that relocated to Boston in 2024. FAA Administrator Bryan Bedford pushed for the program as part of the FAA's broader air traffic control modernization effort. On April 17, 2026, Transportation Secretary Sean Duffy first alluded publicly to the effort, saying that three companies were working with the FAA on software to predict potential flight-path conflicts further in advance. On June 22, 2026, ASI was chosen, after being one of 12 bidders and winning a competition against Palantir and Thales, for a 12-year contract worth up to $875 million.

The contract covers SMART as well as a complementary system called Flow Management Data and Services (FMDS), which aims to support the Air Traffic Control System Command Center with improved data integration, bringing together airline schedules, real-time aircraft positions, and weather information.

As of October 2026, the FAA was also reportedly negotiating for an ownership stake in ASI, whose investors include Andreessen Horowitz.

== Deployment ==
External videos
- News briefing with Transportation Secretary Sean Duffy and FAA Administrator Bryan Bedford, September 21, 2026, C-SPAN

SMART launched on September 21, 2026, at Ronald Reagan Washington National Airport, Dulles International Airport, and Baltimore/Washington International Airport before rolling out elsewhere. On November 10, 2026, the FAA announced that it had deployed the system at all 22 air control centers nationwide and issued a statement describing how the system works:

"A team of FAA specialists in the SMART center in Washington, D.C., analyzes and validates the SMART data and provides scheduling recommendations to the agency's Air Traffic Control System Command Center in Warrenton, VA. The Command Center then routes these recommendations to air traffic control facilities for local leadership to consider."

ASI has denied that it caused the communication outage three days later which prompted a nationwide ground stop.
