= 2023 FAA system outage =

NOTAM system outage

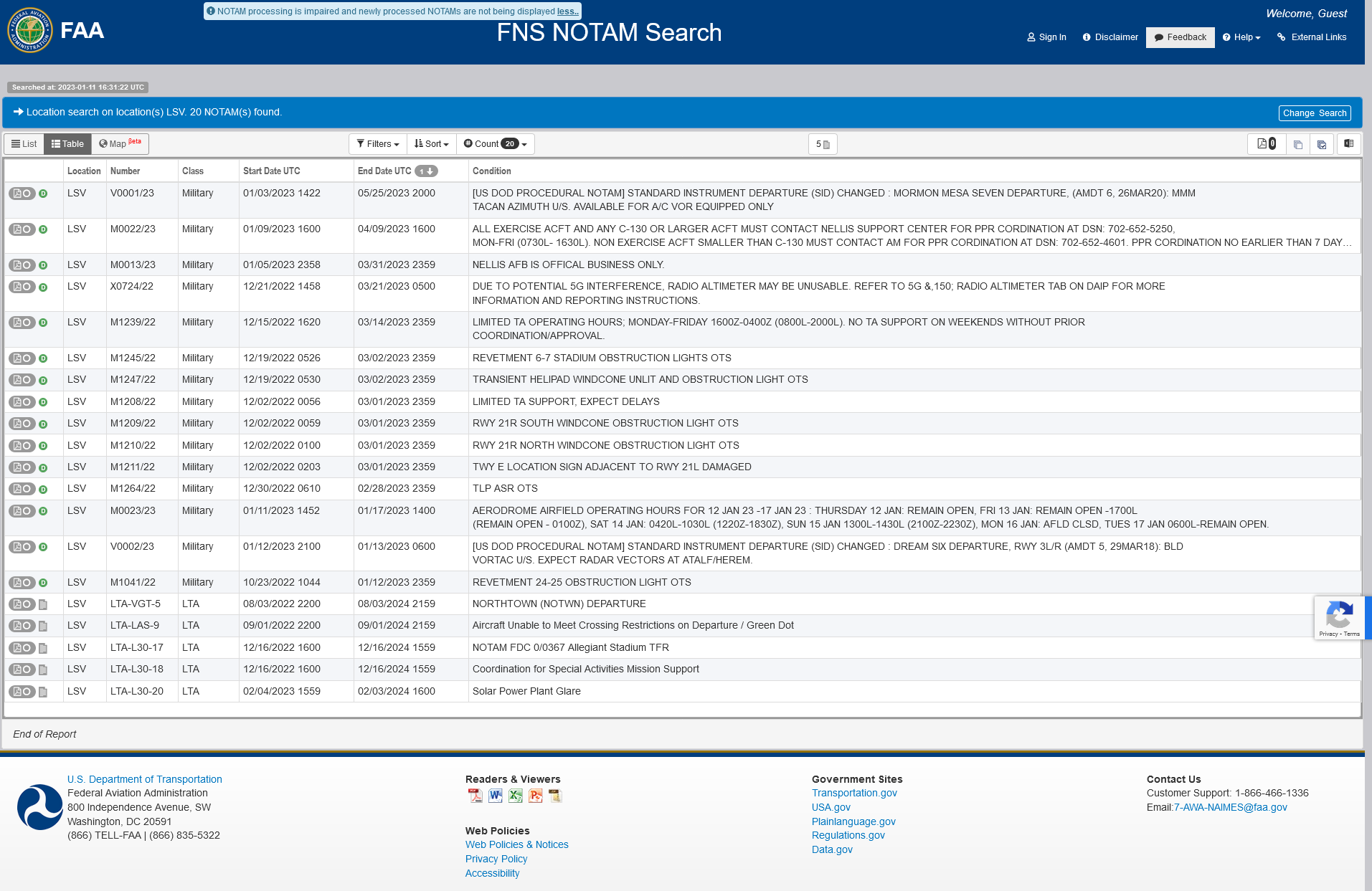
- Screenshot of the FAA's NOTAM search web application, taken on January 11, 2023
- Date: January 11, 2023; 3 years ago
- Duration: 11 hours and 50 minutes
- Location: United States
- Type: Nationwide ground stop
- Cause: NOTAM system failure due to accidental file deletion
- Outcome: Suspension of all U.S. domestic flights

On January 11, 2023, all United States domestic flights were grounded per a nationwide ground stop order by the Federal Aviation Administration (FAA) as the FAA attempted to fix a system outage. The FAA paused all flight departures between 7:30 a.m. and 9 a.m. ET. Flights already in the air were allowed to continue to their destinations. Around 8:30 a.m. ET, flights were beginning to resume departures. The outage was the first time since the September 11 attacks that the FAA issued a nationwide ground stop in the United States.

A preliminary investigation of the incident demonstrated to FAA investigators that a "damaged database file" may have caused the outage of the FAA's Notice to Air Missions (NOTAM) system, responsible for notifying pilots of safety hazards. The FAA told CNN that there was "no evidence of a cyberattack" on its NOTAM system.

== Incident ==
On January 10, 2023, NOTAM system stopped processing updates at 3:28 p.m. ET, and FAA issued the first Air Traffic Control System Command Center Advisory about this incident at 7:47 p.m. ET.

At 7:30 a.m. ET on January 11, the FAA ordered airlines to pause all domestic departures after its pilot-alerting Notice to Air Missions (NOTAM) system went offline overnight, causing extensive disruption. Around 8:30 a.m. ET, flights were beginning to resume departures after the FAA terminated the NOTAM outage advisory, and departures at other airports were expected to resume by 9 am. ET. However, the airlines were free to implement their own ground delay programs subsequent to the ground stop being lifted, potentially leading to further timetable issues.

== Aftermath ==
More than 10,000 flights were delayed within, into or out of the United States.

After the incident, shares of U.S. carriers fell in the premarket trading: Southwest Airlines was down 2.4%, while Delta Air Lines Inc, United Airlines and American Airlines were down about 1%.

Delta Air Lines reported that it had a working backup to the FAA system, but decided not to use it. Delta Air Lines CEO Ed Bastian stated that they didn't use the backup system "out of deference" to the FAA and allowing the FAA to make the decisions.

The FAA adopted new procedures for maintenance of the NOTAM system to prevent future outages.

== Investigation ==
On January 13, 2023, the FAA stated that preliminary analysis of the outage indicates that it was caused by the failure of FAA personnel to follow proper procedures. The incident happened during routine scheduled maintenance. According to the FAA, one engineer mistakenly "replaced one file with another", not realizing that a mistake had been made. FAA officials stated that it was an "honest mistake that cost the country millions." It was later determined that the contractor from Spatial Front, Inc. unintentionally deleted files while "working to correct synchronization between the live primary database and a backup database."

== Reactions ==
President Joe Biden was briefed on the FAA system outage. The White House said there was no evidence of a cyberattack in relation to the system outage, but the president asked for an investigation.

House Transportation Committee chair Sam Graves (R-MO) and Ranking Member Rick Larsen (D-WA) stated that the committee intended to conduct vigorous oversight of the Department of Transportation's plan to prevent such disruption from happening again. A group of more than 120 U.S lawmakers also told the FAA that such incidents were "completely unacceptable."

== See also ==
- 2023 Philippine airspace closure, a similar incident that occurred ten days prior
- 2026 FAA nationwide ground stop
