= 2023 Philippine airspace closure =

Air disruption caused by an electric fault

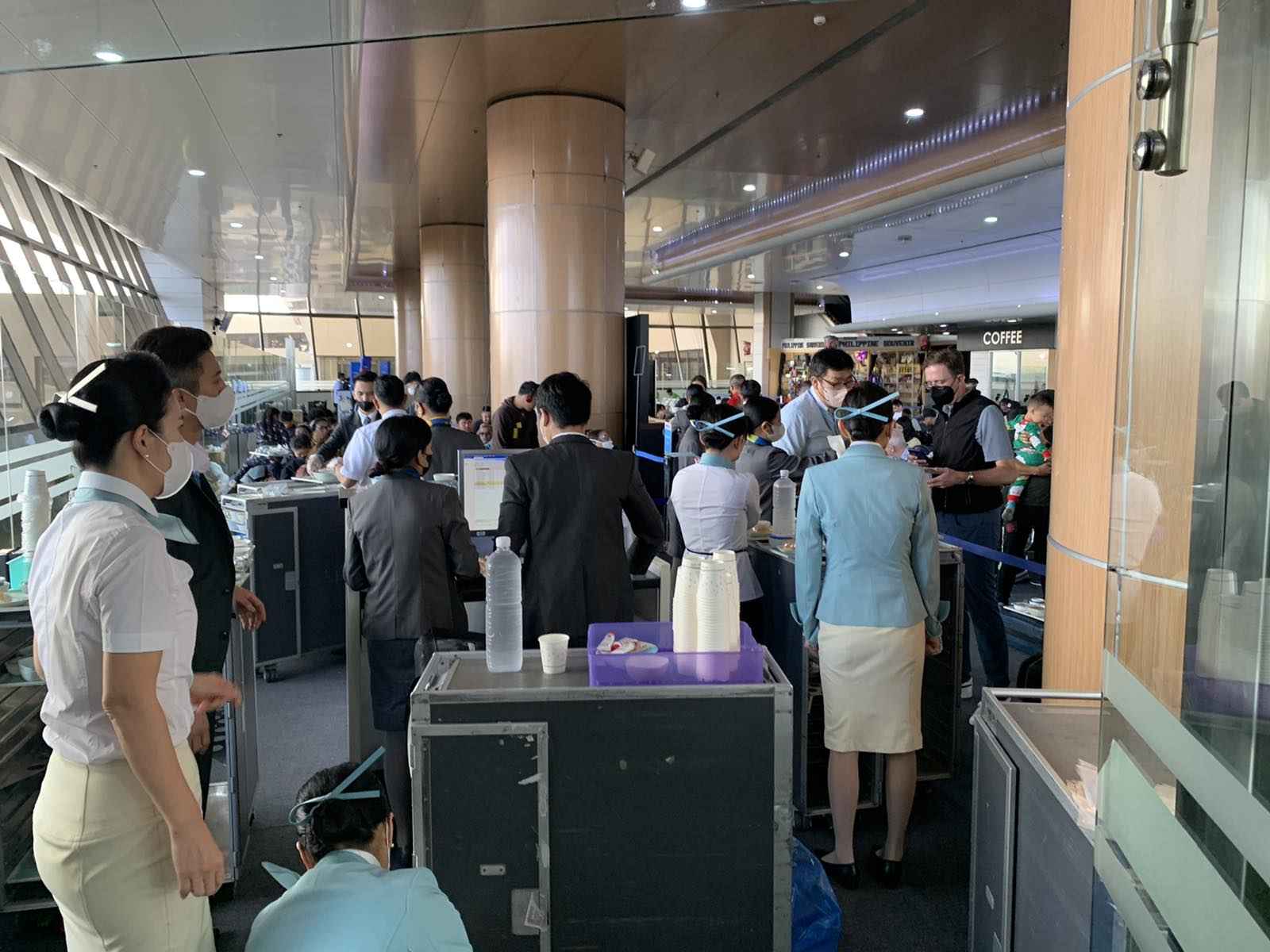
- Korean Air staff distributing food and drinks to passengers of a delayed flight at Ninoy Aquino International Airport during the airspace closure.
- Date: January 1, 2023
- Time: 9:49 a.m. – 4:00 p.m. (PHT, UTC+08:00)
- Duration: ~6 hours
- Location: Philippines
- Cause: Power issues, overvoltage
- Outcome: Philippine airspace and flight information region momentarily closed; Commercial aircraft in Philippine airports grounded; Damage to civilian air traffic management equipment; Around 300 flights affected; 56,000 estimated passengers stranded

On January 1, 2023, at 9:49 a.m. Philippine Standard Time (1:50 a.m. UTC), the Civil Aviation Authority of the Philippines (CAAP) detected issues with its Air Traffic Management Center (ATMC) at Ninoy Aquino International Airport (NAIA) in Pasay, Metro Manila. Electrical problems brought the center's radios and radars offline. Shortly after, nearly all flights towards major airports in the Philippine airspace were put on hold or diverted. Flights that were about to enter the Philippine airspace were either diverted to neighboring countries, returned to point of origin, or rerouted to neighboring airspaces. By noon, no commercial aircraft were inside the Philippine airspace. Around 282 flights to and from various Philippine airports and over 56,000 passengers, many of whom were travelling to or from the country following the New Year's Day holiday, were affected.

The electrical problems were traced back to the power substation of NAIA Terminal 3. A cooling fan for one of the ATMC's uninterruptible power supplies (UPS) had failed and a backup power supply did not start, cutting power to the building. As technicians attempted bypass the UPS units to restore power to the ATMC, they triggered an inadvertent overvoltage, which damaged equipment in the center. Service was partially restored at 4:00 p.m. later that day, and fully restored at 7:45 p.m.

The airspace was closed again for two hours on January 22 to replace the broken cooling fan of one of the power supplies. Two more closures were performed on May 3 and May 17, both lasting two hours, to perform upgrades on the ATMC's power supply systems.

== Background ==
The Civil Aviation Authority of the Philippines (CAAP) is an attached agency of the Department of Transportation (DOTr). It handles air traffic control for civilian flights to and from airports in the Philippines. It manages the Air Traffic Management Center (ATMC) in Pasay, Metro Manila, which operates air traffic control facilities for the Philippine airspace. Modernized CNS/ATM systems across the country were first conceptualized in the late 1990s; development began in 2010 as part of a project funded by the Japan International Cooperation Agency (JICA). The ATMC, along with the new CNS/ATM systems, was inaugurated on January 16, 2018. Operations in the center began on July 26, 2019. Overall, the system cost around ₱13 billion (US$264 million), requiring a ₱10.8 billion (US$219 million) loan from JICA.

The Philippines' largest airport, the four-terminal Ninoy Aquino International Airport (NAIA), is handled by the Manila International Airport Authority (MIAA), a state-owned corporation also under the DOTr. NAIA has been subject to overcrowding, with plans for rehabilitation being set back numerous times towards the end of the 2010s. On December 30, 2022, the government announced a plan to privatize the airport with an aim towards its modernization and rehabilitation.

A power outage at NAIA had previously occurred in September 2022, affecting 30 flights. In preparation for the holiday season, CAAP had prepared 42 commercial airports in the country for a surge in passenger air travel.

== Incident ==
The Manila flight information region (RPHI FIR), which encompasses the entirety of the Philippines' airspace. International airports designated by the Civil Aviation Authority of the Philippines (CAAP) are marked in blue.

At 9:49 a.m. on January 1, 2023 (PHT), the CAAP began experiencing power issues within their ATMC. A cooling fan for one of the ATMC's uninterruptible power supplies had failed and a backup power supply did not automatically start. At 10:51 a.m., NOTAMs reported Manila aerodrome radio frequencies and radars were unserviceable. International flights towards airports in the Philippines began diverting to nearby airports outside of the country. To avoid any potential incidents, CAAP immediately grounded all aircraft. The ATMC's power issues had affected air traffic control for the entire country, and by noon, there were no commercial flights in the air within the Philippines' flight information region. Technicians attempted to bypass the two UPS systems but caused an overvoltage at 12:19 p.m. that damaged one of the center's two very-small-aperture terminals (VSAT).

At the time of the incident, Cebu Pacific and Philippine Airlines both cited a power outage at the ATMC as the cause for the suspension of flights. At 1:54 p.m., MIAA released a press statement stating that all flights to and from Manila were put on hold and that the authority's crisis management and emergency response teams were activated. Food packs, drinks, and relief kits were provided to stranded passengers within the airport. Passengers were requested to await further instructions from their airlines and to stay inside the terminals. Shortly after noon, MIAA general manager Cesar Chiong stated that the power issue was fixed and that service would be restored after system tests.

Service to NAIA was partially restored at 4:00 p.m. on the same day after the CAAP began using radar in Tagaytay, allowing limited operations. The first arrival to the airport following the incident was Philippine Airlines Flight 222 from Brisbane, which landed at 4:55 p.m. that afternoon. At 5:33 p.m., around seven hours after the start of the incident, NAIA made its first departure following the incident – Cathay Pacific Flight 930 to Hong Kong. The ATMC was once again fully operational at 7:45 p.m. after resolving power and equipment issues.

== Aftermath ==
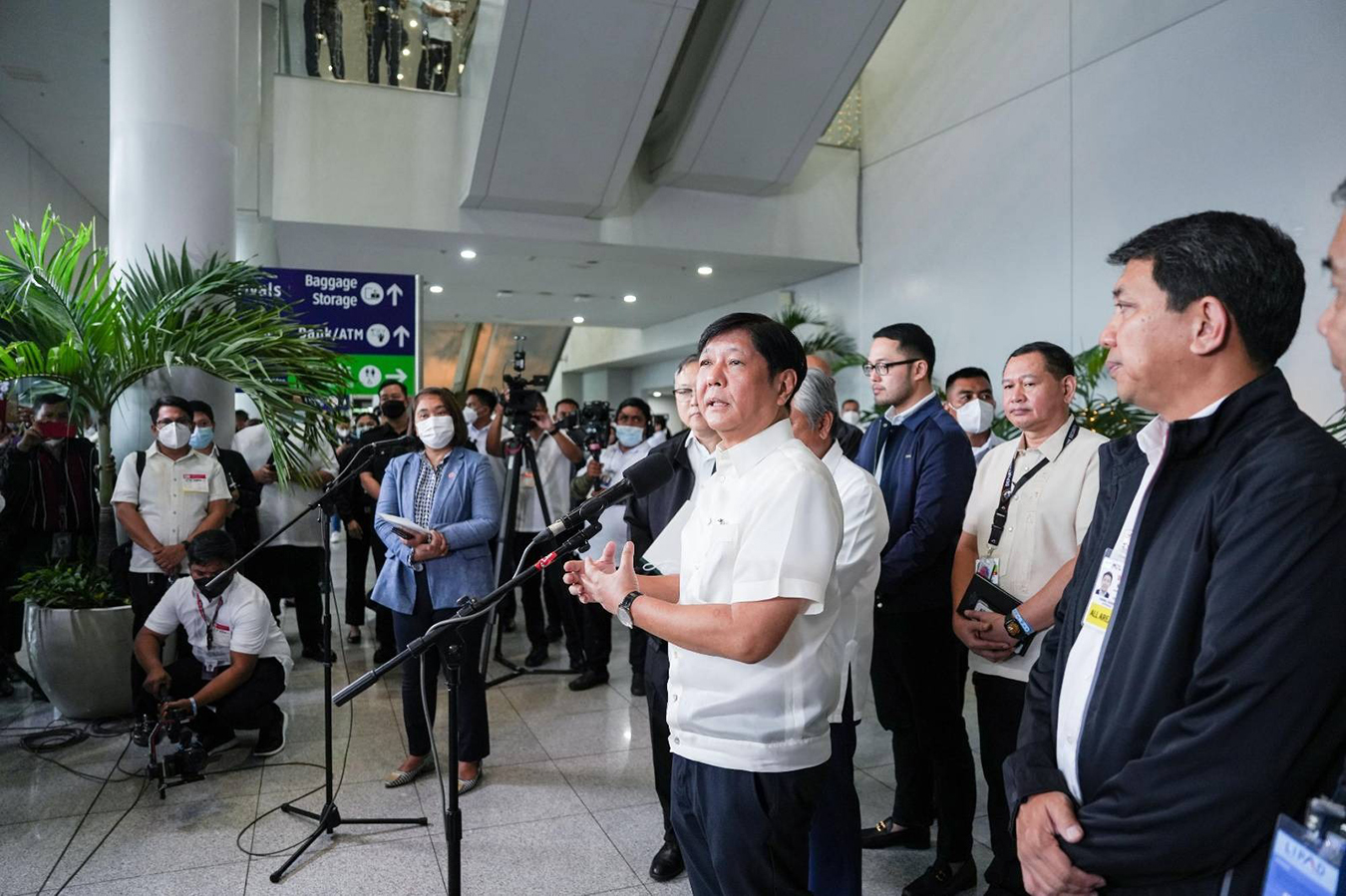
President Bongbong Marcos inspects Terminal 3 of Ninoy Aquino International Airport on January 6, 2023, following the aftermath of the airspace disruption.

By the time service was partially restored, around 282 flights to or from NAIA were affected, 268 of which were cancelled. Seven flights were diverted to other airports, while another seven (all domestic flights) were delayed. Over 56,000 passengers scheduled to arrive or depart NAIA were affected. In Davao City, around 2,600 passengers at Francisco Bangoy International Airport were affected by the technical issue. Around 15 flights at the airport were cancelled, with two diverted and two delayed. Flights were also cancelled at Puerto Princesa International Airport and Zamboanga International Airport, where 1,378 passengers were stranded. Over 65,000 passengers and in total were stranded in airports across the country.

The Land Transportation Franchising and Regulatory Board (LTFRB) began coordinating with transport operators in Metro Manila and Central Luzon to provide free shuttles from NAIA to Clark International Airport, from which some airlines chose to reschedule their flights. LTFRB chairman Teofilo Guadiz stated that the initiative was started "to protect passengers from certain taxis and transport network companies that are taking advantage of the situation by jacking up their surge prices". In order to make up for the delays, airport officials kept NAIA's runways open 24/7 for three days. Officials requested that airliners use wider-bodied aircraft to accommodate more passengers and to schedule more flights. Officials expected a full recovery by 72 hours.

A joint probe of the MIAA and Meralco identified the power substation of NAIA's Terminal 3 as the cause of the power issues. Some equipment needed replacement after sustaining damage from overvoltage. The CAAP admitted after the incident that its equipment was outdated, and that a modernized air traffic management system was already proposed to the national government prior to the incident.

Senator Grace Poe called for contingency plans and assistance following the incident. In a privilege speech in December 2022, Poe had called for the advancement of a rehabilitation project of the DOTr for NAIA. PLDT chairman Manuel V. Pangilinan was one of the affected passengers, whose aircraft returned to Haneda Airport in Japan mid-flight. He offered colocation and additional equipment to help the CAAP following the incident.

President Bongbong Marcos issued a public apology for the disruption. Despite this, he commended his cabinet for doing a "reasonably good job" in resolving the issue. He urged transport secretary Jaime Bautista to expedite the negotiations regarding acquisition of equipment for the upgrade of airports in the country as well as ensure that a proper backup system is in place to prevent a similar incident in the future.

=== Investigation ===
Investigations were conducted by the Philippine House Committee on Transportation and the Senate of the Philippines to determine a possible negligence on the part of the DOTr, CAAP, or any agency involved in the incident. CAAP took full responsibility of the incident. It was later revealed that the ATMC, which was set up by Thales and Sumitomo, had its last proper maintenance more than two years before the incident. It was also revealed that an automatic voltage regulator (AVR) that malfunctioned in August 2022 was yet to be replaced.

Senate President Migz Zubiri also noted the lack of security in CAAP's facilities. CAAP Director-General Manuel Tamayo admitted the lack of closed-circuit televisions (CCTV) in the equipment room housing the ATMC.

== Subsequent closures ==
The airspace was shut down again for two hours on January 22, three weeks after the major shutdown, to carry out the replacement of the cooling fan for the second uninterruptible power supply. The temporary shutdown delayed 47 flights in NAIA.

The MIAA closed the airspace from 2 a.m. to 4 a.m. (lasting two hours) on May 3 and May 17 to repair the malfunctioned automatic voltage regulator and to replace an uninterruptible power supply in the ATMC. Upgrades that added redundancy to the power supply system of the air traffic management system was also performed during the maintenance period.

== See also ==
- 2023 FAA system outage, a similar incident that occurred ten days later in the United States
