= Adam Meyers =

Lawyer and political figure in Canada West

Adam Henry Meyers (July 18, 1812 – July 31, 1875) was a lawyer and political figure in Canada West. He represented North Northumberland then Northumberland in the Legislative Assembly of the Province of Canada from 1844 to 1851.

He was the son of Adam Henry Meyers, a native of Hanover, Germany, and Mary H. Wallbridge. Meyers practised law in Trenton and was a friend of John A. Macdonald. In August 1853, Meyers was shot and wounded by a man named Charles Marsh because, it was alleged, Meyers had seduced Marsh's sister; Marsh was sentenced to 14 years in the provincial penitentiary. Meyers was an unsuccessful candidate for the Northumberland seat in the assembly in 1861. He was named lieutenant-colonel for the local militia in 1869.
