= FAA Telecommunications Infrastructure =

US air traffic control network

The FAA Telecommunications Infrastructure (FTI) is a network used by the US Federal Aviation Administration for radio transmissions, weather reports, radar data, messages, etc. for air traffic control in the United States, serving thousands of air-traffic controllers in US airspace.

== History ==
Harris Corporation, and its successor L3Harris Technologies (since 2019), has been the owner of FTI and prime contractor since 2002, responsible for developing, procuring, and operating the FTI network. The original 15-year contract through 2017 had a base maximum value of $1.3 billion, with an option for FAA to increase services ordered up to a total of $3.5 billion. A 2024 audit by the Department of Transportation Office of Inspector General found that the FAA had extended contracts and expanded contract scope without competition and made questionable noncompetitive award decisions. Total for the contract had risen to $5 billion over 21 years.

FTI was intended to replace seven existing telecommunications networks with a single network that would be less expensive to operate. By 2008, only four of the seven networks had been replaced by FTI. The largest and most costly to be replaced was the Leased Interfacility National Airspace System Communication System (LINCS), which had been operated by MCI WorldCom and then Verizon.

As of November 2026, L3Harris reported completing 70% of the planned conversion from copper wire to fiber optic.

== Incident ==
On 13 November 2026, L3Harris's installation of a router as part of routine replacement of obsolete copper wiring with fiber optic was linked by US government investigators to communication disruptions that led to the 2026 FAA nationwide ground stop.

== From FTI to FENS ==
In 2015, planning was underway for a successor system, initially called "FTI-2", later renamed FAA Enterprise Network Services (FENS), where one goal was to shift way from time division multiplexing (TDM) over copper wires to a network based on Internet Protocol. In March 2023, the FAA awarded a $2.4 billion contract to Verizon over L3Harris, Raytheon Technologies, Leidos, and General Dynamics.

In August 2026, the FAA awarded the FENS lead role to AT&T without a new competition, with Verizon continuing in a support role.
