= Ground stop =

Air traffic control measure that slows the flow of an aircraft inbound to an airport

A ground stop is an air traffic control procedure that requires all aircraft that fit certain criteria to remain on the ground. Applicable criteria may be airport-specific, equipment-specific or airspace-specific, depending on the exact event that caused the ground stop to occur. Ground stops can have disruptive downstream effects, sometimes even after they have been lifted and operations have resumed. A ground stop typically causes flights to be delayed or canceled, which can further cause planes and flight crews to be unable to reach the location of their next scheduled flight.

== Description ==
A ground stop is an air traffic control measure that slows or halts the flow of aircraft that meet certain criteria, requiring all aircraft meeting those criteria to remain on the ground. Often, the criteria are aircraft inbound to a given airport, where a ground stop is the halting of departing aircraft destined for one particular airport or for a specific geographic area. The criteria could be airport-specific or perhaps equipment- or airspace-specific, depending on the exact event that caused the ground stop to occur. A ground stop does not usually affect flights en route (but see the first event cited below under "Notable examples").

=== Use ===
For example, if a ground stop is called for Newark Liberty International Airport, aircraft departing for Newark from other airports will not be given departure clearance until such time as the ground stop in Newark is lifted. This allows, in this example, for Newark to deal with the task at hand before preparing for arriving aircraft once the ground stop is lifted.

Ground stops may occur during an operational event (e.g., a computer outage), a thunderstorm or other weather concerns (e.g., due to the danger of wind shear or hail), or another hazard.

A ground stop can have cascading effects on flight schedules. Flights that have yet to depart may be delayed or canceled by the airline. Additionally, pilots and flight crew may be unable to reach their assigned aircraft on time, leading to further disruptions. As a result, subsequent flights may also be delayed or canceled due to crew members being unavailable.

== United States ==
=== Nationwide ground stops ===
- On September 11, 2001, the National Operations Manager for the U.S. Federal Aviation Administration (FAA) issued an unprecedented ground stop for the entire United States after the second plane hijacked that day crashed into the World Trade Center. It was Ben Sliney's first day in his position as National Operations Manager. After a third hijacked plane crashed into the national military headquarters in the Pentagon, Sliney issued another unprecedented order for all civilian airborne flights to land immediately except for fire fighting planes. The national airspace was closed to incoming international flights, and many were diverted to Canadian airports in what was called Operation Yellow Ribbon, which also cleared Canadian airspace. The US ground stop was lifted in phases over several days, with most departures resuming on September 13.
- On January 11, 2023, a nationwide ground stop was declared across the United States following the failure of the FAA's NOTAM system.
- On November 13, 2026, at 20:54 UTC (3:54 p.m. EST), the FAA issued a nationwide ground stop across the United States due to a communication outage.

=== Ground stops ===
- On January 25, 2019, the FAA declared a ground stop at New York's LaGuardia Airport over a staffing shortage caused by the government shutdown.
- On January 10, 2022, the FAA issued a ground stop for the West Coast of the US and Hawaii. It is speculated it was related to a North Korean missile test, but no official reason was given by the FAA.
- On July 25, 2022, a ground stop was declared at Dallas Love Field in Dallas, Texas, after a woman fired a gun into the air near the ticket counters, prompting an evacuation of the terminal.
- On February 4, 2023, an immediate ground stop was issued by the FAA on the east coast of the Carolinas, impacting Myrtle Beach International Airport, Charleston International Airport and Wilmington International Airport, due to the 2023 Chinese balloon incident.
- On June 7, 2023, the FAA issued a ground stop at LaGuardia Airport in New York City due to extreme smoke haze in the area from Canadian wildfires.
- On July 19, 2024, Delta Air Lines, American Airlines, and United Airlines issued a "global ground stop" amid global computer systems outages.
- On October 14, 2025, Austin–Bergstrom International Airport serving Austin, Texas, had a ground stop due to staffing, potentially related to the 2025 United States federal government shutdown

== Other countries ==
- In January 2014, Nav Canada issued a ground stop for Toronto Pearson International Airport due to cold weather. The airport authority said the extreme cold was causing "equipment freezing and safety issues for employees."

== See also ==
- Security Control of Air Traffic and Air Navigation Aids (SCATANA)
- 2024 CrowdStrike-related IT outages
