= Radiant Systems =

American technology company

Radiant Systems, Inc.
- Type: Public until 2011
- Traded as: Nasdaq: RADS
- Industry: Hospitality and Retail Technology and Support
- Founded: 1985
- Fate: Acquired by NCR Corporation
- Headquarters: Atlanta, Georgia, United States
- Owner: NCR Corporation

Radiant Systems was a provider of technology to the hospitality and retail industries that was acquired by NCR Corporation in 2011. Radiant was based in Atlanta, Georgia. In its last financial report as a public company, Radiant reported revenues of $90 million and net income of $14 million in the six months ended 30 June 2011. At the time of its acquisition, Radiant employed over 1,300 people worldwide. Radiant had offices in North America, Europe, Asia and Australia.

== History ==
In May 1997, Radiant completed the joint acquisition of ReMACS, based in Pleasanton, CA, and Twenty/20 Visual Systems, based in Dallas, Texas. At this time, these acquisitions formed the core of Radiant Hospitality Systems, with 8,000 installed sites.

In March 2000, they joined forces with Microsoft to develop a Web-enabled management system and supply chain solution to enable retailers to conduct business-to-business e-commerce over the Internet.

In July 2011, NCR Corporation announced plans to acquire Radiant Systems for US$1.2 billion. The acquisition was completed on 24 August, 2011.

== Acquisitions ==
Year	Company	Comment	Citations
1997	ReMACS and Twenty/20 Visual Systems	Joint acquisition. ReMACS based in Pleasanton, CA; Twenty/20 Visual Systems based in Dallas, Texas. Formed the core of Radiant Hospitality Systems, with 8,000 installed sites.	
1997	RapidFire Software	It was a Hospitality POS provider. Based in Hillsboro, OR.	
1997	Logic Shop	It was a provider of management software to automotive service centers. Based in Atlanta, GA.	
2001	Breeze Software	It was an Australian provider of point-of-sale and management systems solutions to retailers in the petroleum/convenience store industry.	
2004	Aloha Technologies	It was a provider of point of sale systems for the hospitality industry, located in Dallas, Texas.	
2004	E-Needs	It was a provider of Film Management software and services in the North American exhibition industry, and was based in Irvine, California.	
2005	MenuLink Computer Solutions	Independent supplier of back-office software for the hospitality industry, located in Huntington Beach, California.	
2006	Synchronics	Acquired substantially all assets. It was a provider of business management and point of sale software for the retail market, located in Memphis, Tennessee.	
2007	Quest Retail Technology	It was a provider of point of sale (POS) and back office solutions to stadiums, arenas, convention centers, race courses, theme parks, restaurants, bars and clubs.	
2008	Hospitality EPoS Systems	It was a technology supplier to the U.K. hospitality market since 1992.	
2008	Jadeon	It was one of Radiant's resellers located in California. Operations reported under the Hospitality segment.	
2008	Orderman GmbH	Developsed wireless handheld ordering and payment devices for the hospitality industry. It was headquartered in Salzburg, Austria.	
2011	Texas Digital Systems	Offered order confirmation displays and digital signage solutions.	
