= Foundation for Tolerance International =

The Foundation for Tolerance International is a Kyrgyz non-governmental organization (NGO) founded in 1998 to prevent conflict and build peace and justice in Central Asia. It has operated for nine years in a fluid and changing context, but it has remained focused on its original goals of conflict prevention on a range of vertical and horizontal conflicts. FTI’s work is focused on two main directions:

1. The prevention and non-violent resolution of interethnic conflicts in the Fergana Valley – a multiethnic region that stands at the crossroads of the three Central Asian states of Kyrgyzstan, Uzbekistan, and Tajikistan. The Fergana Valley is characterized notably by a very high population density, an unfinished and conflicting border demarcation process, and disputes over scarce land and water resources. These factors have led to instances of violence amongst local communities and authorities of different nationalities and ethnic groups.

2. The expansion of the space for dialogue and promotion of a culture of non-violence between civil society and power institutions in the Kyrgyz Republic.

== Background ==
The organization originally grew out of the United Nations High Commissioner for Refugees’ (UNHCR) “Conflict Transformation and Tolerance Education” project. The UNHCR’s project was launched in March 1996 in Southern Kyrgyzstan, led by FTI Founder and Executive Director, Raya Kadyrova. Her assignment was to implement a tolerance education project directed at minimizing tension between Kyrgyz and Tajik secondary school students. She says this post inspired her to found FTI as an independent NGO (Strutton 2007). Since then, FTI has developed into one of the largest local NGOs in the region working explicitly and specifically towards conflict prevention and resolution (Global Partnership for the Prevention of Armed Conflict 2007). It employs a staff of over 40 people, all from various nationalities, ages, and fields of expertise. The head office and Early Warning project office are located in Bishkek, while activities at the community level are conducted through four regional offices in the Southern Kyrgyz cities of Osh, Batken, Aksy, and Leilek.

Building strong alliances in Central Asia among all relevant stakeholders has been one of the chief objectives of the organization since its inception. FTI created the National Coordination Council and Regional Coordination Councils, which aim to facilitate communication among civil society, authorities, law enforcement, and the media to prevent and resolve violent conflict. FTI is one of the initiators and lead NGOs of the Ferghana Valley NGO network Dolina Mira ("Valley of Peace") and since 2003, it has taken up the function of Regional Secretariat in Central Asia for the Global Partnership for the Prevention of Armed Conflict (FTI Annual Report 2006). GPPAC functions as a forum for worldwide peace and conflict issues. This global network provides Central Asian civil society with the opportunity to have their voice heard at the global level and to build links with partners facing similar issues in other parts of the world.

== Activities ==
The activities of FTI are varied. They conduct analysis and research on conflict at a range of levels, as well as monitor potential political and ethnic clashes. Their role as monitors has led to the creation of the first early warning system in Central Asia, sustained by human forecasters in the field to identify situations with violence potential (Directory for OCPAP 2002). They have also taken on an advocacy role (Vermont-Mangold 96). For example, the “Ambassadors for Goodwill Network” managed to get influential individuals involved in lobbying for interests of the cross-border communities of Kyrgyzstan, Uzbekistan, and Tajikistan at the regional and national levels. Viewing education as pivotal to increasing tolerance, FTI also sponsors local workshops, trainings and seminars in the south. FTI’s Radio Salam, now an independent commercial organization, contributes to a culture of tolerance among the local youth by broadcasting radio programs devoted to good neighborhood culture and cooperation among the people of the Ferghana Valley (FTI Annual Report 2006). FTI invests time and funding into work with transnational populations as well. In 1999, when the “Small Batken War” in Southern Kyrgyzstan resulted in the displacement of thousands of individuals, FTI assisted the population by establishing camps for internally displaced persons. Future FTI projects include efforts at reducing tensions surrounding illegal migration, raising the legal consciousness of cross-border communities, and research into the rise of transnational religious extremism (Strutton 2007). The regional nature of FTI has facilitated partnerships with UN agencies and organizations in Uzbekistan, Tajikistan, and Kazakhstan to increase the capacity for peaceful development in Kyrgyzstan and neighboring countries.

== Partners ==
FTI’s Regional Partners in Uzbekistan include: Association of Business Women of Uzbekistan, FIDO, “Ishonch,” The Center of Social-Economic Development “Mehr,” and the Tashkent Enlightenment Center. In Tajikistan, FTI collaborates with the Youth Initiative Center “Ittifok,” Institute of Cultural Relations Association for Scientific-Technical Intellectuals (ASTI), and the Public Committee on Democracy Progresses Development. The Institute of Cooperation for Development is FTI's partner in Kazakhstan.

=== International partners ===
FTI’s international partners and donors include: European Center for Conflict Prevention and Hivos in the Netherlands, the Danish Refugee Council and the Danish Institute for Human Rights, Caritas and ACTED in France, the Belgian Ministry of Foreign Affairs, Irish Aid, GTZ in Germany, the Swiss Agency for Development and Cooperation, the European Union, Mercy Corps and USIP in the United States, the Organization for Security and Co-operation in Europe, Counterpart Consortium, Saferworld, the Soros Foundation, and USAID in Kyrgyzstan, and UNDP, UNHCR, UNICEF, and the International Organization for Migration (FTI Annual Report 2006).
