= List of Methodist churches in the United States =

This is a list of Methodist churches in the United States. It includes notable churches either where a church means a congregation (in the New Testament definition) or where a church means a building (in the colloquial sense). It also includes campgrounds and conference centers and retreats that are significant Methodist gathering places, including a number of historic sites of camp meetings. This very limited list includes only historically or architecturally significant buildings, and omits many of the currently very largest and influential congregations which do not meet that standard. Methodism was founded with a large component being a rejection of past churches and was developed by John Wesley and others in large open-air gatherings in Great Britain. In the United States, Methodists (along with Baptists and other Protestants) were major participants in the Second Great Awakening wherein people would travel from a large area to a particular site to camp out, listen to itinerant preachers, and pray. The list also includes selected notable Methodist theological buildings.

In the United States, numerous Methodist churches are listed on the National Register of Historic Places and on state and local historic registers, many reflecting the values of plainness, of Gothic architecture, of simple adornment. The Greek Revival style is also simple and came to be adopted for numerous American Methodist churches.

== Selected salient ones ==
Several, selected significant Methodist churches in the U.S. are:

Church	Image	Dates	Location	City, State	Description
Barratt's Chapel		1780 built 1972 NRHP-listed	39°1′28.6″N 75°27′34.36″W	Frederica, Delaware	"Cradle of Methodism", where Methodism first took hold in the United States in 1784
Lovely Lane United Methodist Church		1884 built 1973 NRHP-listed	39°18′52″N 76°36′57″W	Baltimore, Maryland	Romanesque Revival style, known as the Mother Church of American Methodism
St. George's United Methodist Church		1767 built 1971 NRHP-listed	39°57′17.9″N 75°8′46.82″W	Philadelphia	The oldest Methodist church worship in continuous use in the United States.
Mother Bethel African Methodist Episcopal Church		1794 built 1972 NRHP-listed	39°56′35″N 75°9′9″W	Philadelphia	Romanesque style, The founding church of the African Methodist Episcopal Church.

Other U.S. significant Methodist churches: (by state then city or town)

=== Alabama ===
Church	Image	Dates	Location	City, State	Description
Saint Paul's Methodist Episcopal Church		1888 built 1985 NRHP-listed	1327 Leighton Avenue; 33°39′40″N 85°49′29″W	Anniston, Alabama	Gothic Revival
First United Methodist Church		1872 founded 1891 built 1982 NRHP-listed	6th Avenue North and 19th Street; 33°31′5″N 86°48′38″W	Birmingham, Alabama	Richardsonian Romanesque
St. Luke AME Zion Church		1930 built 2005 NRHP-listed	3937 12th Ave. N 33°32′40″N 86°46′51″W	Birmingham, Alabama	Significant in civil rights in 1962; Gothic Revival
Julia Street Memorial United Methodist Church		1917 built 1999 NRHP-listed	302 Thomas Avenue; 34°12′3″N 86°9′43″W	Boaz, Alabama	Classical Revival
Old Methodist Church (Daphne, Alabama)		1858 built 1980 NRHP-listed	1608 Old County Road; 30°36′6″N 87°54′31″W	Daphne, Alabama	This Greek Revival church building is one of the oldest surviving buildings in the city and now serves as a history museum.
Eufaula First United Methodist Church		1834 founded 1917 built	101 East Barbour Street; 31°53′28″N 85°8′43″W	Eufaula, Alabama	
Lebanon Chapel AME Church		1923 built 1988 NRHP-listed		Fairhope, Alabama	
Twin Beach AME Church		1925 built 1988 NRHP-listed		Fairhope, Alabama	Also known as Twin Beech AME Zion Church
Gainestown Methodist Church		1911 built 1999 NRHP-listed	Walker Springs Road; 31°26′31″N 87°41′40″W	Gainestown, Alabama	
Butler Chapel A.M.E. Zion Church		1913 built 1986 NRHP-listed	407 Oglesby Street 31°49′25″N 86°37′30″W	Greenville, Alabama	
Oakey Streak Methodist Episcopal Church		1875 built 1980 NRHP-listed	Alabama State Route 59, intersection at State Route 23, 31°33′8″N 86°32′13″W	Greenville, Alabama	Gothic
Uchee Methodist Church		1859 built 1997 NRHP-listed	32°21′11″N 85°19′53″W	Hatchechubbee, Alabama	Greek Revival
First United Methodist Church		1833 founded 1921 built 1985 NRHP-listed	1800 3rd Avenue; 33°50′0″N 87°16′40″W	Jasper, Alabama	Beaux Arts style
Latham United Methodist Church		1906 built 1988 NRHP-listed	E side Hwy. 59; 31°5′54″N 87°49′51″W	Latham, Alabama	Late Gothic Revival
Shady Grove Methodist Church and Cemetery		1892 built 2002 NRHP-listed	34°8′29″N 87°2′8″W	Logan, Alabama	Gothic Revival
Andrews Chapel		1860 built 1974 NRHP-listed	U.S. Highway 43; 31°15′51″N 88°1′46″W	McIntosh, Alabama	Squared-log building, one a few surviving log churches in Alabama. Named for Bishop James Osgood Andrew, of the Methodist Episcopal Church, South.
Emanuel AME Church		1869 built 1987 NRHP-listed	656 Saint Michael Street	Mobile, Alabama	
St. Francis Street Methodist Church		1896 built 1984 NRHP-listed	15 Joachim Street; 30°41′30″N 88°2′40″W	Mobile, Alabama	Late Victorian
State Street A.M.E. Zion Church		1854 built 1978 NRHP-listed	502 State Street	Mobile, Alabama	
Old Ship African Methodist Episcopal Zion Church		1852 founded 1918 built 1976 ARLH-listed 1991 NRHP-listed	483 Holcombe Street; 32°22′17″N 86°18′42″W	Montgomery, Alabama	Neoclassical-style church building, the oldest African American church congregation in Montgomery, established in 1852
Mount Sterling Methodist Church		1859 built 1986 NRHP-listed	Junction of county roads 43 and 27; 32°5′28″N 88°9′49″W	Mount Sterling, Alabama	One-story, simple Greek Revival-style, used as a church from 1859 to 1970s. Restored by local historical society over 15 years to serve now as a community hall.
New Market United Methodist Church		1921 built 1990 NRHP-listed	310 Hurricane Road	New Market, Alabama	
Robinson Springs United Methodist Church		1848 built 1977 ARLH-listed; 1982 NRHP-listed	AL 14 and AL 143	Millbrook, Alabama	
St. Luke AME Church		1926 built 2005 NRHP-listed	2803 21st Avenue North	Birmingham, Alabama	Designed by architect Wallace Rayfield
Brown Chapel African Methodist Episcopal Church		1908 built 1976 ARLH-listed; 1982 NRHP-listed; 1997 NHL-designated	410 Martin Luther King Jr. Street; 32°24′44″N 87°0′58″W	Selma, Alabama	Served as a starting point for the Selma to Montgomery marches in 1965 and served as the meeting place and offices for the Southern Christian Leadership Conference during the Civil Rights Movement.
Spring Hill Methodist Church		1841 built 1996 NRHP-listed	Barbour County Road 89; 32°4′48″N 85°20′21″W	Spring Hill, Alabama	Greek Revival
Stockton Methodist Church		1929 built 1988 NRHP-listed	Alabama State Route 59; 31°0′57″N 87°51′11″W	Stockton, Alabama	Neoclassical
Butler Chapel African Methodist Episcopal Zion Church		1957 built 1995 NRHP-listed	1002 N. Church St. 32°25′7″N 85°41′58″W	Tuskegee, Alabama	Late Gothic Revival
First United Methodist Church		1854 built 1973 NRHP-listed	308 Tuskeena St. 32°32′25″N 86°12′12″W	Wetumpka, Alabama	Greek Revival, Italianate

=== Arizona ===
Church	Image	Dates	Location	City, State	Description
First United Methodist Church of Glendale		1928 built 2006 NRHP-listed	7102 North 58th Drive; 33°32′24″N 112°11′4″W	Glendale, Arizona	Late Gothic Revival
Saint John's Methodist Episcopal Church		1917 built 1986 NRHP-listed	318 North 5th Street 35°11′28″N 114°3′0″W	Kingman, Arizona	Classical Revival architecture
Garfield Methodist Church		1925 built 1993 NRHP-listed	1302 East Roosevelt Street 33°27′33″N 112°3′11″W	Phoenix, Arizona	
Moscow Methodist Church and Cemetery		1864 built 2006 NRHP-listed	33°46′42″N 93°22′0″W	Prescott, Arizona	Bungalow, Craftsman
First Methodist Episcopal Church and Parsonage		1891 built 1984 NRHP-listed	127 West Sherman Street 35°19′47″N 112°11′17″W	Williams, Arizona	Gothic Revival
Methodist Episcopal Church		1905 built 1982 NRHP-listed	256 South 1st Avenue 32°43′20″N 114°37′13″W	Yuma, Arizona	Mission Revival

=== Arkansas ===
Church	Image	Dates	Location	City, State	Description
Methodist Episcopal Church, South (Bald Knob, Arkansas)		1927 built 1992 NRHP-listed	Jct. of Main and Center Streets; 35°18′40″N 91°34′4″W	Bald Knob, Arkansas	Late Gothic Revival, Tudor Revival
Bethel African Methodist Episcopal Church		1882 built 1986 NRHP-listed	895 Oak Street 35°46′20″N 91°38′14″W	Batesville, Arkansas	
Bigelow Methodist Episcopal Church, South		1908 built 1996 NRHP-listed	West of Jct. of Volman and Emma Sts.34°59′57″N 92°37′49″W	Bigelow, Arkansas	Plain Traditional
Calico Rock Methodist Episcopal Church		1924 built 2007 NRHP-listed	101 West 1st. 36°7′16″N 92°8′36″W	Calico Rock, Arkansas	Bungalow/craftsman, Colonial Revival
Two Bayou Methodist Church and Cemetery		1875 built 1998 NRHP-listed	33°32′42″N 92°57′44″W	Camden, Arkansas	Greek Revival
Camp Methodist Church		1878 built 1997 NRHP-listed	AK 9, approx. 6 miles E of Salem; 36°24′44″N 91°44′16″W	Camp, Arkansas	Late Gothic Revival, Plain Traditional
Mt. Zion Methodist Church		c. 1910 built 1983 NRHP-listed	County Road 407, approx. 2.5 miles NE of Carthage	Carthage, Arkansas	
Frenchman's Mountain Methodist Episcopal Church-South and Cemetery		1880 built 1976 NRHP-listed		Cato, Arkansas	
Smyrna Methodist Church		1854 built 1992 NRHP-listed	Jaybird Lane	Center Hill, Arkansas	
Clarendon Methodist-Episcopal Church South		1912 built 1984 NRHP-listed	121 Third Street	Clarendon, Arkansas	
First United Methodist Church		1913 built 1992 NRHP-listed	Jct. of Prince and Clifton Streets	Conway, Arkansas	Designed by George W. Kramer; part of the Robinson Historic District
Crossett Methodist Church		1949 built 2010 NRHP-listed	500 Main Street; 33°7′50″N 91°57′42″W	Crossett, Arkansas	Designed by John Parks Almand, has Late Gothic Revival, Tudor Revival
Methodist Episcopal Church, South		1917 built 1996 NRHP-listed	Jct. of Locust Drive and 2nd Street	Dardanelle, Arkansas	
First United Methodist Church		1923 built 1992 NRHP-listed	Jct. of Jefferson and Cross Streets; 34°17′42″N 91°20′16″W	DeWitt, Arkansas	Classical Revival, designed by Thompson & Harding
Emmet Methodist Church		built NRHP-listed		Emmet, Arkansas	
First United Methodist Church		1925 built 1983 NRHP-listed	East 4th and Spring Streets. 33°48′51″N 92°24′44″W	Fordyce, Arkansas	Designed by John Parks Almand
Dodson Avenue Methodist Episcopal Church		built NRHP-listed		Fort Smith, Arkansas	
First United Methodist Church		built NRHP-listed		Forrest City, Arkansas	
First United Methodist Church		built NRHP-listed		Hamburg, Arkansas	
Houston Methodist Episcopal Church, South		built NRHP-listed		Houston, Arkansas	
Imboden Methodist Episcopal Church, South		built NRHP-listed		Imboden, Arkansas	
Mt. Carmel Methodist Church		built NRHP-listed		Jacinto, Arkansas	
First Methodist Church		1913 built 1996 NRHP-listed	Jct. of Chestnut and 4th Streets	Lewisville, Arkansas	
St. Mary's AME Church-Pocahontas Colored School		built NRHP-listed		Pocahontas, Arkansas	
Walnut Grove Methodist Church		built NRHP-listed		Little Rock, Arkansas	
Bethel African Methodist Episcopal Church		1913 built 1996 NRHP-listed	519 West Page Street	Malvern, Arkansas	
Winfield Methodist Church		built NRHP-listed		Little Rock, Arkansas	
First United Methodist Church		1896 built 1986 NRHP-listed	723 Center Street	Little Rock, Arkansas	Designed by Frank W. Gibb in Romanesque style
First United Methodist Church		built NRHP-listed		Lockesburg, Arkansas	
Mallettown United Methodist Church		built NRHP-listed		Mallet Town, Arkansas	
Philadelphia Methodist Church		built NRHP-listed		Melbourne, Arkansas	
East End Methodist Episcopal Church		built NRHP-listed		North Little Rock, Arkansas	
Oark School-Methodist Church		built NRHP-listed		Oark, Arkansas	
Council Grove Methodist Church		built NRHP-listed		Osage Mills, Arkansas	
First Methodist Episcopal Church, South (Ozark, Arkansas)		built NRHP-listed		Ozark, Arkansas	
Methodist Episcopal Church, South (Paris, Arkansas)		built NRHP-listed		Paris, Arkansas	
Old Bethel Methodist Church		built NRHP-listed		Paragould, Arkansas	
Parkdale Methodist Church		built NRHP-listed		Parkdale, Arkansas	
Pleasant Hill Methodist Church		1894 built 1991 NRHP-listed	Jct. of Lawson and Lake Norrell Rds. 34°41′47″N 92°36′56″W	Pleasant Hill, Saline County, Arkansas	Greek Revival, and Vernacular Greek Revival
Portland United Methodist Church		1924 built 2006 NRHP-listed	300 N. Main St. 33°14′28″N 91°30′41″W	Portland, Arkansas	John Parks Almand-designed, in Bungalow/Craftsman style
Powhatan Methodist Church		built NRHP-listed		Powhatan, Arkansas	
Mt. Prospect Methodist Church		1886 built 1990 NRHP-listed	Jct. of Co. Rds. 446 and 61; 33°22′9″N 93°4′32″W	Richland, Arkansas	Greek Revival
Mount Olivet Methodist Church		built NRHP-listed		Rison, Arkansas	
Carolina Methodist Church		built NRHP-listed		Rosston, Arkansas	
First United Methodist Church		1877 built 1992 NRHP-listed	Jct. of Main and Market Sts. 35°15′0″N 91°44′9″W	Searcy, Arkansas	Gothic, Gothic Revival, English Gothic Revival
Selma Methodist Church		built NRHP-listed		Selma, Arkansas	
Sherrill Methodist Episcopal Church, South		1910 built 2002 NRHP-listed	301 Main St. 34°23′15″N 91°57′8″W	Sherrill, Arkansas	Late Gothic Revival, Carpenter Gothic. One of oldest churches, and longest continuously active churches, in the county.
Sardis Methodist Church		built NRHP-listed		Sparkman, Arkansas	
Frank Tillar Memorial Methodist Episcopal Church, South		built NRHP-listed		Tillar, Arkansas	
Mount Olive United Methodist Church		built NRHP-listed		Van Buren, Arkansas	
Wabbaseka Methodist Episcopal Church, South		built NRHP-listed		Wabbeseka, Arkansas	
Mount Pleasant Methodist Church		built NRHP-listed		Waldron, Arkansas	
New Zion AME Zion Church		1927 built 2000 NRHP-listed	Jct. of Myrtle and Neely Streets	Warren, Arkansas	
Williford Methodist Church		1910 built 1992 NRHP-listed	jct. of Ferguson and Hail Streets	Williford, Arkansas	Designed by Richard Beavers

=== California ===
Church	Image	Dates	Location	City, State	Description
Bardsdale Methodist Episcopal Church		1898 built 1986 NRHP-listed	1498 Bardsdale Avenue; 34°22′17″N 118°55′55″W	Fillmore, California	Only example of "Carpenter Gothic" in Ventura County
Fullerton First Methodist Episcopal Church		1909 built 2001 NRHP-listed	117 North Pomona Avenue	Fullerton, California	
Methodist Episcopal Church at Half Moon Bay		1872 built 1980 NRHP-listed	777 Miramontes Street	Half Moon Bay, California	
Methodist Episcopal Church of Pescadero		1890 built 1982 NRHP-listed	108 San Gregorio Street	Pescadero, California	
St. Paul's Methodist Episcopal Church		1867 founded c. 1908 built 1990 NRHP-listed	40 School Street	Point Arena, California	
Park Place Methodist Episcopal Church South		1910 built 1983 NRHP-listed		San Diego, California	Designed by architect Norman Foote Marsh in the Classical Revival style

=== Colorado ===
Church	Image	Dates	Location	City, State	Description
First Methodist Episcopal Church of Delta		1910 built 1991 NRHP-listed	199 E. Fifth St. 38°44′25″N 108°4′9″W	Delta, Colorado	Tudor Revival architecture
Christ Methodist Episcopal Church		built NRHP-listed		Denver, Colorado	
Trinity United Methodist Church		built NRHP-listed		Denver, Colorado	Gothic
Amanda K. Alger Memorial Methodist Episcopal Church		built NRHP-listed		Eaton, Colorado	
Hotchkiss Methodist Episcopal Church		built NRHP-listed		Hotchkiss, Colorado	
Methodist Episcopal Church		built NRHP-listed		Idaho Springs, Colorado	
First Methodist Episcopal Church		built NRHP-listed		Monte Vista, Colorado	
Methodist Episcopal Church of Montrose		1920 built 1999 NRHP-listed	19 S. Park Ave. 38°28′50″N 107°52′24″W	Montrose, Colorado	Designed by Thomas P. Barber, 1990 addition by Patrik Davis
Ruth Memorial Methodist Episcopal Church		built NRHP-listed		Parker, Colorado	
First Methodist Episcopal Church		1902 built 1979 NRHP-listed	400 Broadway St. 38°15′19″N 104°37′23″W	Pueblo, Colorado	A Methodist church from 1902 until past 1939; Romanesque
Stonington First Methodist-Episcopal Church		built NRHP-listed		Stonington, Colorado	
First Methodist Episcopal Church		built NRHP-listed		Trinidad, Colorado	
First Methodist Episcopal Church		built NRHP-listed		Windsor, Colorado	
Dolores United Methodist Church			105 N 8th ST	Dolores, Colorado	A Methodist church established 1904.

=== Connecticut ===
Church	Image	Dates	Location	City, State	Description
Methodist Episcopal Church (Greenwich, Connecticut)		1868 built 1988 NRHP-listed	61 E. Putnam Ave.41°1′58″N 73°37′35″W	Greenwich, Connecticut	Ferris & McClure, with architectural styles: Italianate, Gothic Revival, Carpenter Gothic
Metropolitan African Methodist Episcopal Zion Church		1873 built 1994 NRHP-listed	2051 Main St.41°46′58″N 72°40′37″W	Hartford, Connecticut	Late Victorian
St. Paul's Methodist Episcopal Church		1900 built NRHP-listed	1886-1906 Park St.41°45′50″N 72°42′38″W	Hartford, Connecticut	Romanesque, designed by George W. Kramer
Trinity Methodist Episcopal Church		built 2007 NRHP-listed	69 Main St.41°40′2″N 72°46′51″W	New Britain, Connecticut	Romanesque

Rockville United Methodist Church 142 Grove Street, Rockville, CT 06066

=== Delaware ===
Church	Image	Dates	Location	City, State	Description
Chester-Bethel Church		1780 built	2619 Foulk Road	Wilmington, Delaware	
Bethel Methodist Protestant Church		1871 built 1998 NRHP-listed	Jct. of DE 61, DE 114, and DE 304; 38°51′49″N 75°38′13″W	Andrewsville, Delaware	Gothic
Saxton United Methodist Church		1893 built NRHP-listed	Jct. of Main and Church Sts. 39°3′30″N 75°24′14″W	Bowers, Delaware	Gothic Revival
Trinity Methodist Episcopal Church		1885 built 1978 NRHP-listed	38°45′13″N 75°40′41″W	Bridgeville, Delaware	Gothic
Star Hill AME Church		built NRHP-listed		Camden, Delaware	
Zion African Methodist Episcopal Church		built 1994 NRHP-listed	Center St. 39°7′1″N 75°33′5″W	Camden, Delaware	Classical Revival
Thomas' Methodist Episcopal Chapel		1877 built 1994 NRHP-listed	39°5′55″N 75°42′15″W	Chapeltown, Delaware	Greek Revival
Byrd's AME Church		built NRHP-listed		Clayton, Delaware	
St. John's Methodist Church		built NRHP-listed		Georgetown, Delaware	
West Woods Methodist Episcopal Church		1891 built 2007 NRHP-listed	38°30′29″N 75°22′12″W	Gumboro, Delaware	Late Gothic Revival
Little Creek Methodist Church		1883built 1982 NRHP-listed	Main St. 39°9′49″N 75°26′49″W	Little Creek, Delaware	
Marshallton United Methodist Church		1886 built 1987 NRHP-listed	1105 Stanton Rd. 39°43′36″N 75°38′19″W	Marshallton, Delaware	Country Gothic
Old St. Paul's Methodist Episcopal Church		1851 built 1982 NRHP-listed	High St. 39°27′25″N 75°39′36″W	Odessa, Delaware	Greek Revival
Old Union Methodist Church		1847 built 1973 NRHP-listed	0.2 mi. N of Blackbird Crossroads on U.S. 13; 39°23′15″N 75°39′49″W	Townsend, Delaware	
Grace United Methodist Church		1868 built 1983 NRHP-listed	9th and West Sts. 39°44′46″N 75°33′7″W	Wilmington, Delaware	Gothic
Kingswood Methodist Episcopal Church		1989 NRHP-listed	Fourteenth and Claymont Sts. 39°44′36″N 75°31′58″W	Wilmington, Delaware	Romanesque, Vernacular Romanesque
Mount Lebanon Methodist Episcopal Church		1834 built 1984 NRHP-listed	850 Mount Lebanon Rd. 39°47′54″N 75°34′6″W	Wilmington, Delaware	Late Gothic Revival
Mount Pleasant Methodist Episcopal Church and Parsonage		1838 built 1998 NRHP-listed	39°46′45″N 75°29′27″W	Wilmington, Delaware	Queen Anne, now in a state park
Old Asbury Methodist Church		1789 built 1976 NRHP-listed	Walnut and 3rd Sts. 39°44′17″N 75°32′56″W	Wilmington, Delaware	Italianate, Italianate vernacular
Woodside Methodist Episcopal Church		1889 built 1996 NRHP-listed	Main St., North Murderkill Hundred; 39°4′19″N 75°34′3″W	Woodside, Delaware	Late Gothic Revival

=== District of Columbia ===
Church	Image	Dates	Location	City, State	Description
Eldbrooke United Methodist Church		built 1926; NRHP-listed	4100 River Road, N.W. 38°56′55.72″N 77°4′48.79″W	Washington, D.C.	
Metropolitan African Methodist Episcopal Church		built 1886; NRHP-listed	1518 M Street, N.W. 38°54′19″N 77°2′9″W	Washington, D.C.	
Asbury United Methodist Church (Washington, D.C.)		founded 1836; NRHP-listed	Eleventh and K Sts., NW; 38°54′8″N 77°1′39″W	Washington, D.C.	Designed by Clarence Lowell Harding in Late Gothic Revival and English Gothic Revival architecture
Mount Zion United Methodist Church		built 1876; NRHP-listed	1334 29th St., NW. 38°54′28″N 77°3′31″W	Washington, D.C.	
National United Methodist Church		founded 1852 built 1932	3401 Nebraska Ave NW; 38°56′06″N 77°05′16″W	Washington, D.C.	Formerly Metropolitan Memorial United Methodist Church

=== Florida ===
Church	Image	Dates	Location	City, State	Description
Citra Methodist Episcopal Church-South		built 1998 NRHP-listed	29°24′40″N 82°6′51″W	Citra, Florida	
Mount Olive African Methodist Episcopal Church		built 2000 NRHP-listed	27°58′8″N 82°47′54″W	Clearwater, Florida	
First Methodist Episcopal Church		built 1996 NRHP-listed	27°46′8″N 80°36′4″W	Fellsmere, Florida	
Mount Zion AME Church		built NRHP-listed		Jacksonville, Florida	
United Methodist Church (Jasper, Florida)		1878 built 1978 NRHP-listed	405 Central Avenue, S.W. 30°30′53″N 82°56′52″W	Jasper, Florida	Carpenter Gothic
First United Methodist Church		built NRHP-listed	28°17′22″N 81°24′24″W	Kissimmee, Florida	Late Gothic Revival
Falling Creek Methodist Church and Cemetery		1996 NRHP-listed	30°15′32″N 82°39′52″W	Lake City, Florida	
Greater Bethel AME Church		built NRHP-listed		Miami, Florida	
Miccosukee Methodist Church		1996 NRHP-listed	30°35′36″N 84°2′28″W	Miccosukee, Florida	
Methodist Episcopal Church at Black Creek		1990 NRHP-listed	3925 Main St. 30°4′4″N 81°51′46″W	Middleburg, Florida	
Mount Zion A.M.E. Church		built NRHP-listed		Ocala, Florida	
Orange Springs Methodist Episcopal Church and Cemetery		1988 NRHP-listed	29°30′9″N 81°56′44″W	Orange Springs, Florida	
First Methodist Church of Oviedo		2007 NRHP-listed	263 King St. 28°40′20″N 81°12′48″W	Oviedo, Florida	Another tetrastyle church
First Methodist Church of St. Petersburg		1925 built 1990 NRHP-listed	212 Third St., N. 27°46′31″N 82°38′15″W	St. Petersburg, Florida	Late Gothic Revival
Grace United Methodist Church		1887 built 1979 NRHP-listed	8 Carrera St. 29°52′37″N 81°18′54″W	St. Augustine, Florida	Arranged to be constructed by Henry Flagler, designed by Carrere and Hastings in Spanish Renaissance Revival with Moorish elements
Pisgah United Methodist Church		1974 NRHP-listed	Pisgah Church Road; 30°33′5″N 84°9′49″W	Tallahassee, Florida	
Methodist Episcopal Church, South, at Umatilla		1922 built 2000 NRHP-listed	100 West Guerrant St.28°55′39″N 81°40′17″W	Umatilla, Florida	Gothic, Classical, Prairie, and Italian Renaissance Styles

=== Georgia ===
Church	Image	Dates	Location	City, State	Description
Campbell Chapel AME Church		1869 founded 1920 built 1997 NRHP-listed	429 North Jackson Street	Americus, Georgia	Designed by Louis H. Persley, in Romanesque Revival style
Arlington United Methodist Church		1873 founded 1908 built 1990 NRHP-listed	Pioneer Road at Dogwood Drive; 31°26′21″N 84°43′38″W	Arlington, Georgia	Designed by T. Firth Lockwood, Sr. in Romanesque Revival style
Wesleyan Methodist Campground and Tabernacle		built NRHP-listed		Ashburn, Georgia	
First African Methodist Episcopal Church		1916 built 1980 NRHP-listed	521 North Hull Street	Athens, Georgia	Designed by Louis H. Persley
Butler Street Colored Methodist Episcopal Church		built NRHP-listed		Atlanta, Georgia	
New Hope African Methodist Episcopal Church and Cemetery		built NRHP-listed		Atlanta, Georgia	
Park Street Methodist Episcopal Church, South		built NRHP-listed		Atlanta, Georgia	
St. Mark Methodist Church		1903 built 1987 NRHP-listed	781 Peachtree Street NE; 33.7769°N 84.3839°W	Atlanta, Georgia	
Stewart Avenue Methodist Episcopal Church South		built NRHP-listed		Atlanta, Georgia	
Sam Jones Memorial United Methodist Church		1907 built 1985 NRHP-listed	100 W. Church St. 34°9′58″N 84°47′52″W	Cartersville, Georgia	Designed by Walter T. Downing in Classical Revival style
Chubb Methodist Episcopal Church		built NRHP-listed		Cave Spring, Georgia	
Daes Chapel Methodist Church		built NRHP-listed		Clarkesville, Georgia	
Broad Street Methodist Episcopal Church South		1873 built 1980 NRHP-listed	1323–1325 Broadway 32°28′17″N 84°59′37″W	Columbus, Georgia	Also known as Old Broad Street Methodist Episcopal Church South, Greek Revival style
Methodist Tabernacle		1873 built 1980 NRHP-listed	1323–1325 Broadway; 32°28′17″N 84°59′37″W	Columbus, Georgia	Greek Revival
Rockville Academy and St. Paul Methodist Church Historic District		built NRHP-listed		Eatonton, Georgia	
Cartecay Methodist Church and Cemetery		c. 1859 built 2001 NRHP-listed	Junction of State Route 52 and Roy Road	Ellijay, Georgia	
New Hope AME Church		built NRHP-listed		Guyton, Georgia	
Epworth by the Sea		c. 1880 built NRHP-listed		Saint Simons Island, Georgia	Conference and retreat center whose Lovely Lane Chapel was built in 1880 (reference to Lovely Lane Methodist Church in Baltimore); part of the land is from the former Hamilton Plantation
Hartwell Methodist Episcopal Church, South		built NRHP-listed		Hartwell, Georgia	
St. Thomas African Methodist Episcopal Church		1908 built 2000 NRHP-listed	401 North Dooly Street	Hawkinsville, Georgia	
Liberty Methodist Church		built NRHP-listed		Hephzibah, Georgia	
Second Methodist Church		built NRHP-listed		Lumpkin, Georgia	
Pine Log Methodist Church, Campground, and Cemetery		built NRHP-listed		Rydal, Georgia	
St. Philip AME Church		built NRHP-listed		Savannah, Georgia	
First Methodist Episcopal Church		1907 built 1999 NRHP-listed	Jct. of Third Ave. and Third Street	Stillmore, Georgia	Also known as Stillmore United Methodist Church and as Stillmore Methodist Episcopal Church South
Haven Memorial Methodist Episcopal Church		1888 built 1996 NRHP-listed 2024 NRHP-removed	South of Jct. of Barron Street and 6th Street	Waynesboro, Georgia	
Ebenezer African Methodist Episcopal Church and School		1920 built 2008 NRHP-listed	232 Martin Avenue	Whigham, Georgia	
Whitesville Methodist Episcopal Church, South, and Cemetery		built NRHP-listed		Whitesville, Georgia	
Jackson United Methodist Church		1845 built 1924 NRHP-listed		Jackson, Georgia	
Rock Spring United Methodist Church		1839 built NRHP-listed		Rock Spring, Georgia	

=== Idaho ===
Church	Image	Dates	Location	City, State	Description
Albion Methodist Church		1887 built 1986 NRHP-listed	102 North St. 42°24′47″N 113°34′39″W	Albion, Idaho	Has also been known as "Albion Grange Hall"
Immanuel Methodist Episcopal Church		1910 built 1982 NRHP-listed	1406 West Eastman Street	Boise, Idaho	
First United Methodist Church		1906 built 1979 NRHP-listed	618 Wallace Avenue	Coeur d'Alene, Idaho	
Methodist Episcopal Church		built NRHP-listed		Emmett, Idaho	
Trinity Methodist Church		built NRHP-listed		Idaho Falls, Idaho	
Lewiston Methodist Church		built NRHP-listed		Lewiston, Idaho	
Mackay Methodist Episcopal Church		built NRHP-listed		Mackay, Idaho	
First Methodist Church (Moscow, Idaho)		built NRHP-listed		Moscow, Idaho	
Nampa First Methodist Episcopal Church		built NRHP-listed		Nampa, Idaho	
Sweet Methodist Episcopal Church		built NRHP-listed		Sweet, Idaho	

=== Illinois ===
Church	Image	Dates	Location	City, State	Description
First Methodist Church of Batavia		1852 built 1982 NRHP-listed	41°50′54″N 88°18′50″W	Batavia, Illinois	Greek Revival
United Methodist Church of Batavia		1887 built 1983 NRHP-listed	8 N. Batavia Ave. 41.850556°N 88.311667°W	Batavia, Illinois	Romanesque Revival
Epworth Methodist Episcopal Church		1891 built 2008 NRHP-listed	5253 North Kenmore Avenue; 41°58′19″N 87°39′37″W	Chicago, Illinois	Romanesque, designed by Frederick B. Townsend
First United Methodist Church of Chicago		1924 built	77 W. Washington Street; 41°52′59″N 87°37′50″W	Chicago, Illinois	Neo-gothic skyscraper 173 m/568 ft tall, designed by Holabird & Roche. World's tallest church building. Building is named Chicago Temple.
Ebenezer Methodist Episcopal Chapel and Cemetery		1858 built 1984 NRHP-listed	NW of Golden; 40°6′35″N 91°1′7″W	Golden, Illinois	
Lemont Methodist Episcopal Church		1861 built 1986 NRHP-listed	306 Lemont St. 41°40′23″N 88°0′0″W	Lemont, Illinois	Italianate
Allen Chapel African Methodist Episcopal Church (Lincoln, Illinois)		built NRHP-listed		Lincoln, Illinois	

=== Indiana ===
Church	Image	Dates	Location	City, State	Description
Aurora Methodist Episcopal Church		built NRHP-listed		Aurora, Indiana	
Bethel Methodist Episcopal Church		built NRHP-listed		Bluffton, Indiana	
Salem Methodist Episcopal Church		built NRHP-listed		Clinton, Indiana	
Mount Zion Methodist Episcopal Church		1867 built 2008 NRHP-listed	40°20′56″N 85°24′25″W	Eaton, Indiana	Gable Front, Other
Brick Chapel United Methodist Church		built NRHP-listed		Greencastle, Indiana	
Simpson Memorial United Methodist Church		1899 built 2004 NRHP-listed	9449 Harrison St. 38°22′23″N 85°59′29″W	Greenville, Indiana	Gothic, Akron Plan, Other
St. Stephen's African Methodist Episcopal Church		built NRHP-listed		Hanover, Indiana	
Central Avenue Methodist Church		built NRHP-listed as part of the Old Northside Historic District		Indianapolis, Indiana	Now known as the Landmarks Center, home to Indiana Landmarks
Roberts Park Methodist Episcopal Church		built NRHP-listed		Indianapolis, Indiana	
Stidham United Methodist Church		built NRHP-listed		Lafayette, Indiana	
Pinhook Methodist Church and Cemetery		built NRHP-listed		LaPorte, Indiana	
Hamline Chapel, United Methodist Church		1847 built 1982 NRHP-listed	High and Vine Sts. 39°5′29″N 84°50′51″W	Lawrenceburg, Indiana	Greek Revival
Moores Hill United Methodist Church		built NRHP-listed		Moores Hill, Indiana	
Bethel A.M.E. Church (Richmond, Indiana)		built NRHP-listed		Richmond, Indiana	
St. Paul Methodist Episcopal Church		built NRHP-listed		Rushville, Indiana	
Allen Chapel African Methodist Episcopal Church (Terre Haute, Indiana)		1913 built 1975 NRHP-listed	218 Crawford St.39.459722°N 87.414167°W	Terre Haute, Indiana	
Tyson United Methodist Church		built NRHP-listed		Versailles, Indiana	
Independence Methodist Church		built NRHP-listed		Wheatfield, Indiana	

=== Iowa ===
Church	Image	Dates	Location	City, State	Description
German Methodist Episcopal Church		built 1868; NRHP-listed	7th and Washington Sts. 40°48′42″N 91°6′24″W	Burlington, Iowa	
St. Paul United Methodist Church		built 1914; NRHP-listed	1340 3rd Ave. SE; 41°59′8″N 91°39′10″W	Cedar Rapids, Iowa	Louis Sullivan-designed
First United Methodist Church		built 1899; NRHP-listed	923 Roland; 41°1′1″N 93°18′28″W	Chariton, Iowa	
St. John's United Methodist Church		built 1903; NRHP-listed	1325-1329 Brady St. 41°32′01″N 90°34′25″W	Davenport, Iowa	
Bethel AME Church		built 1909; NRHP-listed	323 W. 11th St. 41°31′51″N 90°34′41″W	Davenport, Iowa	
Washington Prairie Methodist Church		built 1863; NRHP-listed	43°14′17″N 91°44′38″W	Decorah, Iowa	
Burns United Methodist Church		built 1912; NRHP-listed	811 Crocker St. 41°35′37″N 93°37′41″W	Des Moines, Iowa	
First United Methodist Church		built 1908; NRHP-listed	10th and Pleasant Streets; 41°35′21″N 93°37′51″W	Des Moines, Iowa	
Trinity United Methodist Church		built 1911; NRHP-listed	1548 8th St. 41°36′17″N 93°37′10.13″W	Des Moines, Iowa	
St. Luke's United Methodist Church		built NRHP-listed	1199 Main St. 42°30′13″N 90°40′9″W	Dubuque, Iowa	
Bethel AME Church		built 1868; NRHP-listed	411 S. Governor St. 41°39′22″N 91°31′23″W	Iowa City, Iowa	
First Methodist Episcopal Church		built 1899; NRHP-listed	401 2nd. St. 43°21′7″N 93°12′40″W	Kensett, Iowa	
Sharon Methodist Episcopal Church		built 1874; NRHP-listed	1223 125th St. 41°59′43″N 90°51′18″W	Lost Nation, Iowa	
St. Luke's Methodist Church		built 1950; NRHP-listed	211 N. Sycamore St. 42°14′22.4304″N 91°11′19.5246″W	Monticello, Iowa	
Pine Mills German Methodist Episcopal Church		built 1867; NRHP-listed	180th St. and Verde Ave. 41°28′50″N 90°52′51″W	Muscatine, Iowa	
Palmyra Methodist Episcopal Church		built 1868; NRHP-listed	Southwest of Hartford, Iowa; 41°26′4″N 93°26′5″W	Palmyra, Iowa	
Middlefork Methodist Episcopal Church		built 1886; NRHP-listed	S of US 169 on E side of Middle Fork, Grand R. 40°35′47″N 94°19′3″W	Redding, Iowa	
Rose Hill Methodist Episcopal Church		built 1897; NRHP-listed	304 Main St. 41°19′14″N 92°27′55″W	Rose Hill, Iowa	
First Methodist Church		built 1895; NRHP-listed	302 S. Carroll St. 43°25′45″N 96°10′19″W	Rock Rapids, Iowa	
West Grove United Methodist Church		built 1904; NRHP-listed	40°43′32″N 92°33′23″W	West Grove, Iowa	
Prairie Center Methodist Episcopal Church and Pleasand Hill Cemetery		built 1881; NRHP-listed	41°44′45″N 94°15′2″W	Yale, Iowa	

=== Kansas ===
Church	Image	Dates	Location	City, State	Description
Campbell Chapel AME Church		1878 built 2003 NRHP-listed	715 Atchison St. 39.565365°N 95.122376°W -->	Atchison, Kansas	
Burr Oak United Methodist Church		1912 built 2007 NRHP-listed	NE corner Pennsylvania & Washington Sts. 39°52′9″N 98°18′12.4″W	Burr Oak, Kansas	
Bethel African Methodist Episcopal Church		built NRHP-listed		Coffeyville, Kansas	
St. Martha's AME Church and Parsonage		built NRHP-listed		Highland, Kansas	
Niotaze Methodist Episcopal Church		built NRHP-listed		Niotaze, Kansas	
Saint Luke African Methodist Episcopal Church		built NRHP-listed		Lawrence, Kansas	
First Methodist Episcopal Church		built NRHP-listed		Stafford, Kansas	
St. John African Methodist Episcopal Church		built NRHP-listed		Topeka, Kansas	
Grace Methodist Episcopal Church		built NRHP-listed		Wichita, Kansas	
Grace Methodist Episcopal Church		built NRHP-listed		Winfield, Kansas	
United Methodist Church of the Resurrection		1990 founded 2017 built		Leawood, Kansas	Largest United Methodist congregation in the United States

=== Kentucky ===
Church	Image	Dates	Location	City, State	Description
Wesley Methodist Church		built NRHP-listed		Anchorage, Kentucky	
St. James AME Church		built NRHP-listed		Ashland, Kentucky	
Brandenburg Methodist Episcopal Church		1855 built 1984 NRHP-listed	215 Broadway37°59′59″N 86°10′9″W	Brandenburg, Kentucky	
Burnside Methodist Church		built NRHP-listed		Burnside, Kentucky	
First United Methodist Church		built NRHP-listed		Catlettsburg, Kentucky	
Olive Branch Methodist Episcopal Church		built NRHP-listed		Finchville, Kentucky	
Methodist Episcopal Church South (Greenup, Kentucky)		built NRHP-listed		Greenup, Kentucky	
St. Peters AME Church		built NRHP-listed		Harrodsburg, Kentucky	
Helena United Methodist Church		built NRHP-listed		Helena, Kentucky	
Thomas Chapel C.M.E. Church		built NRHP-listed		Hickman, Kentucky	
Freeman Chapel C.M.E. Church		built NRHP-listed		Hopkinsville, Kentucky	
Lafayette Methodist Church		built NRHP-listed		Lafayette, Kentucky	
Mt. Olivet Methodist Church		1886 built 1985 NRHP-listed	37°44′47″N 84°39′7″W	Lancaster, Kentucky	Italianate
Methodist Episcopal Church		built NRHP-listed		Lancaster, Kentucky	
Bryantsville Methodist Church		built NRHP-listed		Lancaster, Kentucky	
First United Methodist Church		built NRHP-listed		Louisa, Kentucky	
Louisa United Methodist Church		built NRHP-listed		Louisa, Kentucky	
Broadway Temple A.M.E. Zion Church		built NRHP-listed		Louisville, Kentucky	
Fourth Avenue Methodist Episcopal Church		built NRHP-listed		Louisville, Kentucky	
Chestnut Street Methodist Church		built NRHP-listed		Louisville, Kentucky	
Epworth Methodist Evangelical Church		built NRHP-listed		Louisville, Kentucky	
Middletown United Methodist Church		built NRHP-listed		Middletown, Kentucky	
KEAS Tabernacle Christian Methodist Episcopal Church		built NRHP-listed		Mount Sterling, Kentucky	
Methodist Episcopal Church South (Mount Sterling, Kentucky)		built NRHP-listed		Mount Sterling, Kentucky	
Salem Methodist Episcopal Church and Parsonage		built NRHP-listed		Newport, Kentucky	
Fairview Methodist Church		built NRHP-listed		Oakland, Kentucky	
Oil Springs Methodist Church		built NRHP-listed		Oil Springs, Kentucky	
Mayo Methodist Church		built NRHP-listed		Paintsville, Kentucky	
First Methodist Church (Paintsville, Kentucky)		built NRHP-listed		Paintsville, Kentucky	
Old Zion Methodist Church		built NRHP-listed		Park City, Kentucky	
Methodist Episcopal Church, South (Prestonsburg, Kentucky)		built NRHP-listed		Prestonsburg, Kentucky	
Pleasant Run Methodist Church		built NRHP-listed		Russellville, Kentucky	
Bethel AME Church		built NRHP-listed		Shelbyville, Kentucky	
St. John United Methodist Church		built NRHP-listed		Shelbyville, Kentucky	
Simpsonville Methodist Church		built NRHP-listed		Simpsonville, Kentucky	
Johnson's Chapel AME Church		built NRHP-listed		Springfield, Kentucky	
Big Bone Methodist Church		built NRHP-listed		Union, Kentucky	
Corinth Christian Methodist Episcopal Church		built NRHP-listed		Winchester, Kentucky	

=== Louisiana ===
Church	Image	Dates	Location	City, State	Description
First Methodist Church (Alexandria, Louisiana)		1907 built 1980 NRHP-listed	630 Jackson St. 31°18′37″N 92°26′54″W	Alexandria, Louisiana	Romanesque
Holly Grove Methodist Church		built NRHP-listed		Anacoco, Louisiana	
Arizona Methodist Church		built NRHP-listed		Arizona, Louisiana	
Alabama Methodist Church		built NRHP-listed		Bernice, Louisiana	
White's Chapel United Methodist Church		built NRHP-listed		Bunkie, Louisiana	
Hickory Springs Methodist Episcopal Church		built NRHP-listed		Chatham, Louisiana	
First United Methodist Church		built NRHP-listed		Columbia, Louisiana	
First United Methodist Church		built NRHP-listed		DeRidder, Louisiana	
Elton United Methodist Church		built NRHP-listed		Elton, Louisiana	
Clear Creek AME Church		built NRHP-listed		Felixville, Louisiana	
Gibson Methodist Episcopal Church		built NRHP-listed		Gibson, Louisiana	
Grand Cane United Methodist Church		built NRHP-listed		Grand Cane, Louisiana	
Harrisonburg Methodist Church		1854 built 1927 renovated 2015 NRHP-listed	105 Pine St. 31°46′15″N 91°49′16″W	Harrisonburg, Louisiana	Classical Revival-style church with a covered portico and a "witch s hat" cupola upon which a crucifix rises.
Keachi United Methodist Church		built NRHP-listed		Keachi, Louisiana	
First United Methodist Church		built NRHP-listed		Lafayette, Louisiana	
First United Methodist Church		built NRHP-listed		Leesville, Louisiana	
Loranger Methodist Church		built NRHP-listed		Loranger, Louisiana	
Lutcher United Methodist Church		built NRHP-listed		Lutcher, Louisiana	
Tulip Methodist Church		built NRHP-listed		Marsalis, Louisiana	
St. James United Methodist Church		built NRHP-listed		Monroe, Louisiana	
First United Methodist Church		built NRHP-listed		New Iberia, Louisiana	
St. James AME Church		built NRHP-listed		New Orleans, Louisiana	
St. Peter A.M.E. Church		built NRHP-listed		New Orleans, Louisiana	
Poplar Chapel AME Church		built NRHP-listed		Rayville, Louisiana	
Robeline Methodist Church		built NRHP-listed		Robeline, Louisiana	
St. Maurice Methodist Church		built NRHP-listed		St. Maurice, Louisiana	
First United Methodist Church		built NRHP-listed		West Monroe, Louisiana	

=== Maine ===
Church	Image	Dates	Location	City, State	Description
Gray Memorial United Methodist Church and Parsonage		built NRHP-listed		Caribou, Maine	
Deering Memorial United Methodist Church		built NRHP-listed		Paris, Maine	
Chestnut Street Methodist Church		built NRHP-listed		Portland, Maine	
Dunstan Methodist Episcopal Church		built NRHP-listed		Scarborough, Maine	
West Durham Methodist Church		built NRHP-listed		West Durham, Maine	

=== Maryland ===
Church	Image	Dates	Location	City, State	Description
Asbury Methodist Episcopal Church		built NRHP-listed		Allen, Maryland	
Mt. Moriah African Methodist Episcopal Church		built NRHP-listed		Annapolis, Maryland	
Dorguth Memorial United Methodist Church		built NRHP-listed		Baltimore, Maryland	
Grace-Hampden Methodist Episcopal Church		built NRHP-listed		Baltimore, Maryland	
Madison Avenue Methodist Episcopal Church		built NRHP-listed		Baltimore, Maryland	
Mount Vernon Place United Methodist Church and Asbury House		built NRHP-listed		Baltimore, Maryland	
Orchard Street United Methodist Church		built NRHP-listed		Baltimore, Maryland	
Sharp Street Memorial United Methodist Church and Community House		built NRHP-listed		Baltimore, Maryland	
Rock Creek Methodist Episcopal Church		built NRHP-listed		Chance, Maryland	
Mt. Tabor Methodist Episcopal Church		1893 built 2001 NRHP-listed		Crownsville, Maryland	
African Methodist Episcopal Church		1892 built 1979 NRHP-listed	39°39′22.18″N 78°45′35.96″W	Cumberland, Maryland	
St. John's Methodist Episcopal Church and Joshua Thomas Chapel		built NRHP-listed		Deal Island, Maryland	
Wesley Chapel Methodist Episcopal Church		built NRHP-listed		Eldersburg, Maryland	
St. Peter's Methodist Episcopal Church		built NRHP-listed		Hopewell, Maryland	
Ridgley Methodist Episcopal Church		built NRHP-listed		Landover, Maryland	
Quindocqua United Methodist Church		built NRHP-listed		Marion, Maryland	
Bethlehem Methodist Episcopal Church		built NRHP-listed		Taylor's Island, Maryland	
Old Friendship United Methodist Church		built NRHP-listed		West Post Office, Maryland	
St. Paul's Methodist Episcopal Church		built NRHP-listed		Westover, Maryland	

=== Massachusetts ===
Church	Image	Dates	Location	City, State	Description
Goodwin Memorial African Methodist Episcopal Zion Church		built NRHP-listed		Amherst, Massachusetts	
Calvary Methodist Church		built NRHP-listed		Arlington, Massachusetts	
Methodist Church		built NRHP-listed		Barnstable, Massachusetts	
Charles Street African Methodist Episcopal Church		built NRHP-listed		Boston, Massachusetts	
Greenwood Memorial United Methodist Church		built NRHP-listed		Boston, Massachusetts	
St. Mark's Methodist Church		built NRHP-listed		Brookline, Massachusetts	
First Methodist Church (Clinton, Massachusetts)		built NRHP-listed		Clinton, Massachusetts	
Brayton Methodist Episcopal Church		built NRHP-listed		Fall River, Massachusetts	
Clinton African Methodist Episcopal Zion Church		built NRHP-listed		Great Barrington, Massachusetts	
South Harwich Methodist Church		built NRHP-listed		Harwich, Massachusetts	
Bethel African Methodist Episcopal Church and Parsonage		built NRHP-listed		Plymouth, Massachusetts	
Center Methodist Church		built NRHP-listed		Provincetown, Massachusetts	
Wesley Methodist Church		built NRHP-listed		Salem, Massachusetts	
Notre Dame Catholic Church		built NRHP-listed		Southbridge, Massachusetts	
Methodist Episcopal Society of Tyringham		built NRHP-listed		Tyringham, Massachusetts	

=== Michigan ===
Church	Image	Dates	Location	City, State	Description
Central Mine Methodist Church		1869 built 1970 NRHP-listed	Old Stage Rd.47°24′25″N 88°12′13″W	Central, Michigan	
West Vienna United Methodist Church		1882 built 1983 NRHP-listed	5461 Wilson Rd.43°9′45″N 83°47′30″W	Clio, Michigan	Greek Revival
Central United Methodist Church		1866 built 1982 NRHP-listed	42°20′15″N 83°3′3″W	Detroit, Michigan	Tudor Revival, Gothic Revival, Other
Metropolitan United Methodist Church		built NRHP-listed		Detroit, Michigan	
Cass Avenue Methodist Episcopal Church		1883 built 1982 NRHP-listed	42°20′53″N 83°3′47″W	Detroit, Michigan	Mason & Rice; Malcomson & Higginbotham; Romanesque Revival architecture
Dixboro United Methodist Church		built NRHP-listed		Dixboro, Michigan	
Highland United Methodist Church		built NRHP-listed		Highland, Michigan	
First United Methodist Church		built NRHP-listed		Highland Park, Michigan	
Trinity United Methodist Church		built NRHP-listed		Highland Park, Michigan	
Central Methodist Episcopal Church		built NRHP-listed		Lansing, Michigan	
Grace Methodist Episcopal Church		built NRHP-listed		Petoskey, Michigan	
First Methodist Episcopal Church of Pokagon		built NRHP-listed		Pokagon Township, Michigan	
First Methodist Episcopal Church		built NRHP-listed		Port Hope, Michigan	
Salem Methodist Episcopal Church and Salem Walker Cemetery		built NRHP-listed		Salem, Michigan	
Central Methodist Episcopal Church		built NRHP-listed		Sault Ste. Marie, Michigan	

=== Minnesota ===
Church	Image	Dates	Location	City, State	Description
Lenora Methodist Episcopal Church		built NRHP-listed		Canton, Minnesota	
Coleraine Methodist Episcopal Church		built NRHP-listed		Coleraine, Minnesota	
St. Mark's African Methodist Episcopal Church		1913 built 1991 NRHP-listed	530 N. 5th Ave. E. 46°47′45″N 92°5′53.5″W	Duluth, Minnesota	Duluth's first building constructed by and for African Americans.
Portland Prairie Methodist Episcopal Church		built NRHP-listed		Eitzen, Minnesota	
Hastings Methodist Episcopal Church		1862 built 1978 NRHP-listed	719 Vermillion St. 44°44′18.5″N 92°51′8″W	Hastings, Minnesota	Gothic Revival, Greek Revival, and Italianate
Fowler Methodist Episcopal Church		1906 built 1976 NRHP-listed	2011 Dupont Ave. S. 44°57′45″N 93°17′34″W	Minneapolis, Minnesota	Designed by Warren H. Hayes in Romanesque style and completed by Harry Wild Jones. Now the Minneapolis Scottish Rite Temple.
Wesley United Methodist Church		1891 built 1984 NRHP-listed	101 E. Grant St. 44°58′10.6″N 93°16′34″W	Minneapolis, Minnesota	Romanesque
Norwood Methodist Episcopal Church		built NRHP-listed		Norwood, Minnesota	
Ottawa Methodist Episcopal Church		built NRHP-listed		Ottawa, Minnesota	
Spring Valley Methodist Episcopal Church		built NRHP-listed		Spring Valley, Minnesota	

=== Mississippi ===
Church	Image	Dates	Location	City, State	Description
First Methodist Church (Brookhaven, Mississippi)		built NRHP-listed		Brookhaven, Mississippi	
Byhalia United Methodist Church		built NRHP-listed		Byhalia, Mississippi	
Mt. Pleasant Methodist Church		built NRHP-listed		Caledonia, Mississippi	
Wesley Memorial Methodist Episcopal Church		built NRHP-listed		Greenwood, Mississippi	
First Methodist Church of Greenwood		built NRHP-listed		Greenwood, Mississippi	
Pleasant Valley Methodist Church		1840 built 1996 NRHP-listed	31°45′38″N 90°33′13″W	Hazlehurst, Mississippi	Mid 19th Century Revival
Tabernacle Methodist Church		1857 built 1996 NRHP-listed	31°54′37″N 90°28′17″W	Hazlehurst, Mississippi	Mid 19th Century Revival
Kingston Methodist Church		1856 built 1982 NRHP-listed	31°23′21″N 91°16′43″W	Natchez, Mississippi	Greek Revival
Shubuta Methodist Episcopal Church, South		1891 built 1994 NRHP-listed	High St. (US 45), E side 31°51′33″N 88°41′59″W -->	Shubuta, Mississippi	Carpenter Gothic
First Methodist Church (Tupelo, Mississippi)		built NRHP-listed		Tupelo, Mississippi	
China Grove Methodist Church		1861 built 1984 NRHP-listed	31°12′33″N 90°3′28″W	Tylertown, Mississippi	Greek Revival
Carpenter United Methodist Church		1901 built 1996 NRHP-listed	32°2′8″N 90°40′53″W	Utica, Mississippi	Carpenter Gothic
Bethel African Methodist Episcopal Church		built NRHP-listed		Vicksburg, Mississippi	
Washington Methodist Church		1828 built 1986 NRHP-listed	Main and Church Sts. 31°34′41″N 91°18′8″W	Washington, Mississippi	Federal

=== Missouri ===
Church	Image	Dates	Location	City, State	Description
St. Paul A.M.E. Church		1891 built 1980 NRHP-listed		Columbia, Missouri	
Greenlawn Methodist Church and Cemetery		c. 1883 built 2007 NRHP-listed	Jct of Route J and County Road D	Perry, Missouri	also known as Scobee Chapel and Greenlawn Memorial Chapel
Manchester United Methodist Church		1859 built 1983 NRHP-listed	129 Woods Mill Road	Manchester, Missouri	formerly Manchester Methodist Episcopal Church
Northern Methodist Episcopal Church of Clarksville		built NRHP-listed		Clarksville, Missouri	
Quinn Chapel AME Church		built NRHP-listed		St. Louis, Missouri	
Oakley Chapel African Methodist Episcopal Church		built NRHP-listed		Tebbetts, Missouri	
Olive Chapel African Methodist Episcopal Church		built NRHP-listed		Kirkwood, Missouri	
Washington Metropolitan African Methodist Episcopal Zion Church		built NRHP-listed		St. Louis, Missouri	
Centenary Methodist Episcopal Church, South		built NRHP-listed		St. Louis, Missouri	
Missouri United Methodist Church		built NRHP-listed		Columbia, Missouri	
First Methodist Church (Excelsior Springs, Missouri)		built NRHP-listed		Excelsior Springs, Missouri	
Bond's Chapel Methodist Episcopal Church		built NRHP-listed		Hartsburg, Missouri	
Campbell Chapel African Methodist Episcopal Church		built NRHP-listed		Glasgow, Missouri	
Warren Street Methodist Episcopal Church		built NRHP-listed		Warrensburg, Missouri	
Cook Avenue Methodist Episcopal Church, South		built NRHP-listed		St. Louis, Missouri	
Washington Chapel C.M.E. Church		built NRHP-listed		Parkville, Missouri	

=== Montana ===
Church	Image	Dates	Location	City, State	Description
Methodist Church of Alberton		1912 built 1997 NRHP-listed	802 Railroad Street	Alberton, Montana	
Methodist Episcopal Church of Anaconda		built NRHP-listed		Anaconda, Montana	
Methodist Episcopal Church		1873 built 1987 NRHP-listed	121 South Willson	Bozeman, Montana	
Methodist Episcopal Church and Parsonage		built NRHP-listed		Bridger, Montana	
First Episcopal Methodist Church of Chester		1911 built 1997 NRHP-listed	Junction of 2nd St. and Madison; 48°30′39″N 110°57′44″W	Chester, Montana	
Methodist Episcopal Church South (Corvallis, Montana)		1894 built 1997 NRHP-listed	Jct. of First St. and Eastside Hwy. 46°18′57″N 114°6′48″W	Corvallis, Montana	Late Victorian, Gothic
Fromberg Methodist-Episcopal Church		built NRHP-listed		Fromberg, Montana	
First Methodist Episcopal Church and Parsonage		1909 built 1988 NRHP-listed	209 North Kendrick	Glendive, Montana	
First United Methodist Church Parsonage		built NRHP-listed		Great Falls, Montana	
Union Bethel African Methodist Episcopal Church		built NRHP-listed		Great Falls, Montana	
Scandinavian Methodist Church		1896 built 1994 NRHP-listed	203 Fifth Avenue West	Kalispell, Montana	
Methodist-Episcopal Church of Marysville		1887 built 1984 NRHP-listed	corner of Grand Street and 3rd Street	Marysville, Montana	
Stevensville Grade School-United Methodist Church		built NRHP-listed		Stevensville, Montana	
Methodist Episcopal Church (Three Forks, Montana)		built NRHP-listed		Three Forks, Montana	
Stateler Memorial Methodist Church		built NRHP-listed		Willow Creek, Montana	
Grace United Methodist Church		built NRHP-listed		Billings, Montana	

=== Nebraska ===
Church	Image	Dates	Location	City, State	Description
Salem Swedish Methodist Episcopal Church		1883 built 1982 NRHP-listed		Axtell, Nebraska	also known as John Fletcher Christian College Chapel
St. Paul's Methodist Protestant Church		1900 built 1979 NRHP-listed	on Nebraska Highway 17	Culbertson, Nebraska	
Quinn Chapel African Methodist Episcopal Church and Parsonage		1905 built 1999 NRHP-listed	1225 South 9th Street	Lincoln, Nebraska	Designed by architect A.W. Woods
First Welch Calvinistic Methodist Church and Cemetery		built NRHP-listed		Monroe, Nebraska	
Trinity United Methodist Church		built NRHP-listed	511 North Elm Street 40.92748307608097°N 98.3478073927519°W	Grand Island, Nebraska	

=== Nevada ===
Church	Image	Dates	Location	City, State	Description
Austin Methodist Church		1866 built 2003 NRHP-listed	135 Court St. 39°29′32″N 117°4′6″W	Austin, Nevada	Italianate
Bethel AME Church		built NRHP-listed		Reno, Nevada	
First United Methodist Church		built NRHP-listed		Reno, Nevada	

=== New Hampshire ===
Church	Image	Dates	Location	City, State	Description
Asbury United Methodist Church		1844 built 1983 NRHP-listed	42°53′17″N 72°28′14″W	Chesterfield, New Hampshire	"Mother church" of Methodism in New Hampshire; Greek Revival style.
Grace United Methodist Church		1869 built 1985 NRHP-listed	42°56′8″N 72°16′49″W	Keene, New Hampshire	High Victorian Gothic style church designed by Shepard S. Woodcock, built larger and more expensively than its parishioners could afford.
Springfield Town Hall and Howard Memorial Methodist Church		1797 built 1986 NRHP-listed	Four Corners Rd. SE of New London Rd. 43°29′43″N 72°2′55″W	Springfield, New Hampshire	Greek Revival, Gothic Revival
Tuftonboro United Methodist Church		c.1853 built 1997 NRHP-listed	43°41′45″N 71°13′16″W	Tuftonboro, New Hampshire	Notable as an "excellent" Greek Revival style church

=== New Jersey ===
Church	Image	Dates	Location	City, State	Description
Princeton United Methodist Church		1847 founded 1911 built	7 Vandeventer Ave. 40°21′02.6″N 74°39′25.1″W	Princeton, New Jersey	Located on Nassau Street across from Princeton University in the Princeton Historic District
Solomon Wesley United Methodist Church		1850 built 1989 NRHP-listed	291-B Davistown Rd./Asyla Rd. 39°47′35″N 75°2′46″W	Blackwood, New Jersey	
Rockaway Valley Methodist Church		built NRHP-listed		Boonton, New Jersey	
New Asbury Methodist Episcopal Meetinghouse		built NRHP-listed		Cape May Court House, New Jersey	
Glendale Methodist Episcopal Church		built NRHP-listed		Glendale, New Jersey	
Trinity African Methodist Episcopal Church		built NRHP-listed		Gouldtown, New Jersey	
Methodist Episcopal Church (Madison, New Jersey)		1870 built 2008 NRHP-listed	24 Madison Ave.	Madison, New Jersey	Romanesque
Clarksburg Methodist Episcopal Church		1845 built 1999 NRHP-listed	512 Cty Rd. 524; 40°11′29″N 74°27′5″W	Millstone Township, New Jersey	Mid 19th Century Revival
First Methodist Episcopal Church		built NRHP-listed		Montclair, New Jersey	
Mount Salem Methodist Episcopal Church		built NRHP-listed		Alexandria Township, New Jersey	
Ocean Grove Camp Meeting		founded 1869; NRHP-listed		Ocean Grove, New Jersey	
Simpson United Methodist Church		built NRHP-listed		Perth Amboy, New Jersey	
Richwood Methodist Church		1860 built 1979 NRHP-listed	Elmer Road; 39°43′18″N 75°10′1″W	Richwood, New Jersey	
Harmony Hill United Methodist Church		built NRHP-listed		Stillwater, New Jersey	
Bethel African Methodist Episcopal Church		built NRHP-listed		Springtown, New Jersey	
Stockholm United Methodist Church		built NRHP-listed		Stockholm, New Jersey	
Mount Zion African Methodist Episcopal Church and Mount Zion Cemetery		built NRHP-listed		Woolwich Township, New Jersey	
Mount Bethel Methodist Church		built NRHP-listed		Vienna, New Jersey	
Port Elizabeth United Methodist Church		1785 founded 1827 built	142 Port Elizabeth - Cumberland Road; 39°18′52.3″N 74°58′51.8″W	Port Elizabeth, New Jersey	Federal Architecture style. Designated by Greater New Jersey Annual Conference "United Methodist Historic Site No. 511" in 2015.
Methodist Episcopal Church of Hibernia		1869 built 2011 NRHP-listed	419 Green Pond Road; 40°56′44″N 74°29′40″W	Hibernia, New Jersey	Gothic Revival
Mount Hope Miners' Church		1868 built 2012 NRHP-listed	Mount Hope Road; 40°55′42″N 74°32′39″W	Mount Hope, New Jersey	Also known as Mount Hope Methodist Episcopal Church
Stanhope United Methodist Church		1920 built 2012 NRHP-listed	2 Ledgewood Avenue; 40°54′5″N 74°42′19″W	Netcong, New Jersey	Historically known as The Church in the Glen
First Methodist Episcopal Church		1895 built 2017 NRHP-listed	116 East Washington Avenue; 40°45′33″N 74°58′36″W	Washington, New Jersey	Richardsonian Romanesque
First United Methodist Church		1908 built 1982 NRHP-listed	41 East Blackwell Street; 40°53′5″N 74°33′23″W	Dover, New Jersey	Romanesque Revival, Gothic Revival

=== New Mexico ===
Church	Image	Dates	Location	City, State	Description
First Methodist Episcopal Church		1904 built 1976 NRHP-listed	3rd St. and Lead Ave. 35°4′52.5″N 106°39′4.5″W	Albuquerque, New Mexico	Late Gothic Revival, Folk Gothic
First Methodist Church of Clovis		built NRHP-listed		Clovis, New Mexico	
Phillips Chapel CME Church		built NRHP-listed		Las Cruces, New Mexico	
St. John's Methodist Episcopal Church		built NRHP-listed		Raton, New Mexico	
First United Methodist Church of Deming		1976 built NRHP-listed	1020 South Granite Street	Deming, New Mexico	

=== New York ===
Church	Image	Dates	Location	City, State	Description
Calvary Methodist Episcopal Church		1914 built 2008 NRHP-listed	42°39′53″N 73°47′30″W	Albany, New York	Collegiate Gothic
Densmore Methodist Church of the Thousand Islands		1900 built 1988 NRHP-listed		Alexandria, New York	
North Settlement Methodist Church		c. 1826 built 1996 NRHP-listed		Ashland, New York	
West Settlement Methodist Church		1832 built 1996 NRHP-listed		Ashland, New York	
Thompson A.M.E. Zion Church		1891 built 1974 NRHP-listed; 1974 NHL-listed	33 Parker Street 42°54′39.97″N 76°34′4.01″W	Auburn, New York	Part of a U.S. National Historic Landmark honoring Harriet Tubman at the Harriet Tubman National Historical Park; church is Late Victorian and Stick/Eastlake style
Wall Street Methodist Episcopal Church		1788 built 1999 NRHP-listed	69 Wall Street	Auburn, New York	
First Methodist Episcopal Church of Avon		1879 built 2005 NRHP-listed	130 Genesee Street	Avon, New York	Also known as Avon United Methodist Church
Bay Shore Methodist Episcopal Church		1867 built 2001 NRHP-listed		Bay Shore, New York	Also known as the United Methodist Church of Bay Shore
Trinity Methodist Church		c. 1849 built 2010 NRHP-listed	8 Mattie Cooper Square	Beacon, New York	
East Berkshire United Methodist Church		built NRHP-listed		Berkshire, New York	
Bloomville Methodist Episcopal Church		built NRHP-listed		Bloomville, New York	
Andrews United Methodist Church		built NRHP-listed		Brooklyn, New York	
Bay Ridge United Methodist Church		built NRHP-listed		Brooklyn, New York	
Buck's Bridge United Methodist Church		built NRHP-listed		Buck's Bridge, New York	
Delaware Avenue Methodist Episcopal Church		built NRHP-listed		Buffalo, New York	
Durham Memorial A.M.E. Zion Church		built NRHP-listed		Buffalo, New York	
Richmond Avenue Methodist-Episcopal Church		built NRHP-listed		Buffalo, New York	
Methodist Episcopal Church of Butler		built NRHP-listed		Butler Center, New York	
Callicoon Methodist Church and Parsonage		built NRHP-listed		Callicoon, New York	
Canastota Methodist Church		built NRHP-listed		Canastota, New York	
United Methodist Church (Chaumont, New York)		built NRHP-listed		Chaumont, New York	
Cochecton Center Methodist Episcopal Church		built NRHP-listed		Cochecton Center, New York	
Newtonville United Methodist Church		built NRHP-listed		Colonie, New York	
Commack Methodist Church and Cemetery		1789 built 1985 NRHP-listed	486 Townline Road	Commack, New York	Designed by James Hubbs
Copake United Methodist Church and Copake Cemetery		built NRHP-listed		Copake, New York	
Crescent Methodist Episcopal Church		built NRHP-listed		Crescent, New York	
Asbury United Methodist Church and Bethel Chapel and Cemetery		built NRHP-listed		Croton-on-Hudson, New York	
Methodist Episcopal Church of East DeKalb		built NRHP-listed		DeKalb, New York	
Methodist Episcopal Church (Dryden, New York)		1874 built 1984 NRHP-listed	2 North St.42°29′26″N 76°17′51″W	Dryden, New York	Romanesque
West Dryden Methodist Episcopal Church		built NRHP-listed		Dryden, New York	
Duane Methodist Episcopal Church		c. 1883 built 1991 NRHP-listed	NY 26 east of jct. with Kenny Road	Duane, New York	
Dundee United Methodist Church		1899 built 2004 NRHP-listed	35 Water Street	Dundee, New York	
Ellis Methodist Episcopal Church		built NRHP-listed		Ellis Hollow, New York	
Fly Creek Methodist Church		built NRHP-listed		Fly Creek, New York	
East Genoa Methodist Episcopal Church		built NRHP-listed		Genoa, New York	
Glen Wild Methodist Church		built NRHP-listed		Glen Wild, New York	
First United Methodist Church		built NRHP-listed		Gloversville, New York	
Harpursville United Methodist Church		built NRHP-listed		Harpursville, New York	
Old Hawleyton Methodist Episcopal Church		c. 1856 built 2006 NRHP-listed	923 Hawleyton Road	Hawleyton, New York	
First United Methodist Church		built NRHP-listed		Ilion, New York	
Italy Valley Methodist Church		built NRHP-listed		Italy, New York	
Leon United Methodist Church		built NRHP-listed		Leon, New York	
Lodi Methodist Church		built NRHP-listed		Lodi, New York	
Logan Methodist Church		built NRHP-listed		Logan, New York	
Mamaroneck Methodist Church		built NRHP-listed		Mamaroneck, New York	
Middlesex Center Methodist Church		built NRHP-listed		Middlesex, New York	
Vine Valley Methodist Church		built NRHP-listed		Middlesex, New York	
United Methodist Church (Morristown, New York)		built NRHP-listed		Morristown, New York	
United Methodist Church and Parsonage		1868 built 1982 NRHP-listed	300 East Main	Mount Kisco, New York	
First United Methodist Church		built NRHP-listed		Mount Vernon, New York	
Narrowsburg Methodist Church		1856 built 2000 NRHP-listed	16 Lake Street 41°36′18″N 75°3′45″W	Narrowsburg, New York	Greek Revival
John Street United Methodist Church		1841 built 1973 NRHP-listed	44 John Street 40°42′32.55″N 74°0′31.25″W	New York City	Also known as Old John Street Methodist Episcopal Church, Georgian style designed by Philip Embury
North Ridge United Methodist Church		built NRHP-listed		North Ridge, New York	
Methodist-Episcopal Church of Norwich		built NRHP-listed		Norwich, New York	
St. Paul's United Methodist Church		1894 built 2001 NRHP-listed		Nyack, New York	Designed by Marshall L. Emery & Emery
Oak Hill Methodist Episcopal Church		1859 built 2006 NRHP-listed	42°24′45″N 74°9′18″W	Oak Hill, New York	Greek Revival
Oak Hill Methodist Episcopal Church		built NRHP-listed		Oak Hill, New York	
La Fargeville United Methodist Church		built NRHP-listed		Orleans, New York	
Methodist Episcopal Church (Orleans, New York)		built NRHP-listed		Orleans, New York	
Methodist-Protestant Church at Fisher's Landing		built NRHP-listed		Orleans, New York	
Waits Methodist Episcopal Church and Cemetery		built NRHP-listed		Owego, New York	
First Methodist Episcopal Church of Parksville		built NRHP-listed		Parksville, New York	
United Methodist Church		1889 built 1984 NRHP-listed	South Ocean Ave. and Church Street	Patchogue, New York	Designed by Oscar Teale
First Methodist Episcopal Church of Perry		built NRHP-listed		Perry, New York	
Petersburgh United Methodist Church		built NRHP-listed		Petersburgh, New York	
Port Gibson United Methodist Church		built NRHP-listed		Port Gibson, New York	
Yatesville Methodist Church		built NRHP-listed		Potter, New York	
Trinity Methodist Episcopal Church and Rectory		built NRHP-listed		Poughkeepsie, New York	
Tompkins Corners United Methodist Church		built NRHP-listed		Putnam Valley, New York	
Welsh Calvinistic Methodist Church		built NRHP-listed		Remsen, New York	
Hillside Methodist Church		built NRHP-listed		Rhinebeck, New York	
Riverside Methodist Church and Parsonage		built NRHP-listed		Rhinecliff, New York	
Richmondville United Methodist Church		built NRHP-listed		Richmondville, New York	
First Methodist Episcopal Church of Rome		built NRHP-listed		Rome, New York	
Methodist Church		built NRHP-listed		Sandy Creek, New York	
Gallupville Methodist Church		built NRHP-listed		Schoharie, New York	
Wesleyan Methodist Church		1843 built 1980 NRHP-listed	126 Fall Street	Seneca Falls, New York	
Mt. Zion Methodist Church		built NRHP-listed		Somers, New York	
Spencerport Methodist Church		built NRHP-listed		Spencerport, New York	
Woodrow Methodist Church		1842 built 1967 NYCL-listed; 1982 NRHP-listed	1109 Woodrow Road	Staten Island, New York	
Starkey United Methodist Church		built NRHP-listed		Starkey, New York	
Methodist Episcopal Church (Stony Creek, New York)		built NRHP-listed		Stony Creek, New York	
First Methodist Episcopal Church of Nyack		1813 built 1998 NRHP-listed	jct of North Broadway and Birchwood Avenue	Upper Nyack, New York	Also known as Old Stone Church
Vernon Methodist Church		built NRHP-listed		Vernon, New York	
Ladentown United Methodist Church		built NRHP-listed		Village of Pomona, New York	
Walden United Methodist Church		built NRHP-listed		Walden, New York	
United Methodist Church (Waterloo, New York)		built NRHP-listed		Waterloo, New York	
Ohio Street Methodist Episcopal Church Complex		built NRHP-listed		Watervliet, New York	
Methodist Episcopal Church of West Martinsburg		built NRHP-listed		West Martinsburg, New York	
Methodist Episcopal Church of Windham Centre		built NRHP-listed		Windham, New York	

=== North Carolina ===
Church	Image	Dates	Location	City, State	Description
Fulton United Methodist Church		1888 built 1979 NRHP-listed	off NC 801, south of Advance	Advance, North Carolina	
Ebenezer Methodist Church		1890 built 1985 NRHP-listed	SR 1008, near Bells	Bells, North Carolina	
Thomas Chapel A.M.E. Zion Church		1922 built 2009 NRHP-listed	300 Cragmont Road	Black Mountain, North Carolina	Also known as Tom's Chapel
Carver's Creek Methodist Church		1859 built 2008 NRHP-listed	16904 NC 87 East, near Council	Council, North Carolina	Also known as Carver's Creek United Methodist Church
Mount Zion United Methodist Church		1883 built 1986 NRHP-listed	SR 1503, near Crabtree	Crabtree, North Carolina	
Mount Ebal Methodist Protestant Church		built NRHP-listed		Denton, North Carolina	
Duke Memorial United Methodist Church		built NRHP-listed		Durham, North Carolina	
St. Joseph's African Methodist Episcopal Church		built NRHP-listed		Durham, North Carolina	
Trinity Methodist Church		built NRHP-listed		Elizabethtown, North Carolina	
Eureka United Methodist Church		1884 built 1982 NRHP-listed	Church St.35°32′40″N 77°52′47″W	Eureka, North Carolina	Carpenter Gothic style
Camp Ground Methodist Church		built NRHP-listed		Fayetteville, North Carolina	
Hay Street Methodist Church		built NRHP-listed		Fayetteville, North Carolina	
Garysburg United Methodist Church and Cemetery		built NRHP-listed		Garysburg, North Carolina	
Germanton Methodist Church and Cemetery		built NRHP-listed		Germanton, North Carolina	
Tabernacle Methodist Protestant Church and Cemetery		built NRHP-listed		Greensboro, North Carolina	
West Market Street Methodist Episcopal Church, South		built NRHP-listed		Greensboro, North Carolina	
Snow Creek Methodist Church and Burying Ground		built NRHP-listed		Harmony, North Carolina	
Salem Methodist Church		built NRHP-listed		Huntsboro, North Carolina	
Lake Toxaway Methodist Church		built NRHP-listed		Lake Toxaway, North Carolina	
St. Frances Methodist Church		built NRHP-listed		Lewiston, North Carolina	
First United Methodist Church		built NRHP-listed		Lincolnton, North Carolina	
Centenary Methodist Church (New Bern, North Carolina)		built NRHP-listed		New Bern, North Carolina	
Rue Chapel AME Church		built NRHP-listed		New Bern, North Carolina	
Hebron Methodist Church		built NRHP-listed		Oakville, North Carolina	
St. Paul A.M.E. Church		built NRHP-listed		Raleigh, North Carolina	
Asbury Methodist Church (Raynham, North Carolina)		built NRHP-listed		Raynham, North Carolina	
Centenary Methodist Church (Rowland, North Carolina)		built NRHP-listed		Rowland, North Carolina	
Gilboa Methodist Church		built NRHP-listed		Salem, North Carolina	
Rehoboth Methodist Church		built NRHP-listed		Skinnersville, North Carolina	
Center Street A.M.E. Zion Church		built NRHP-listed		Statesville, North Carolina	
Purdie House and Purdie Methodist Church		built NRHP-listed		Tar Heel, North Carolina	
Weaverville United Methodist Church		built NRHP-listed		Weaverville, North Carolina	
Webster Methodist Church		built NRHP-listed		Webster, North Carolina	
Wentworth Methodist Episcopal Church and Cemetery		built NRHP-listed		Wentworth, North Carolina	
Goler Memorial African Methodist Episcopal Zion Church		c. 1918 built 1998 NRHP-listed		Winston-Salem, North Carolina	Also known as Old Goler

Ebenezer United Methodist Church Mount Holly, North Carolina

=== North Dakota ===
Church	Image	Dates	Location	City, State	Description
Methodist Episcopal Church (Devils Lake, North Dakota)		1915 built 2008 NRHP-listed	601 5th St. NE. 48°6′56″N 98°51′24″W	Devils Lake, North Dakota	Designed by Joseph A. Shannon in Classical Revival, Romanesque
Drayton United Methodist Church		1906 built 1979 NRHP-listed	ND 44; 48°33′48″N 97°10′37″W	Drayton, North Dakota	Akron Plan church in Romanesque, Late Romanesque Revival, Other

=== Ohio ===
Church	Image	Dates	Location	City, State	Description
Wesley Temple AME Church		1928 built 1994 NRHP-listed	104 N. Prospect St.41°5′10″N 81°30′38″W	Akron, Ohio	Classical Revival
First Methodist Episcopal Church of Alliance, Ohio		built NRHP-listed		Alliance, Ohio	
Bethel Methodist Church		1818 built 1978 NRHP-listed	39°0′26″N 84°8′18″W	Bantam, Ohio	
Canal Winchester Methodist Church		built NRHP-listed		Canal Winchester, Ohio	
First Methodist Episcopal Church		built NRHP-listed		Canton, Ohio	
Chesterville Methodist Church		1851 built 1979 NRHP-listed	Sandusky and East Sts. 40°28′46″N 82°40′54″W	Chesterville, Ohio	Greek Revival
Clifton Methodist Episcopal Church		built NRHP-listed		Cincinnati, Ohio	
First German Methodist Episcopal Church		built NRHP-listed		Cincinnati, Ohio	
Hyde Park Methodist Episcopal Church		built NRHP-listed		Cincinnati, Ohio	
Northside United Methodist Church		built NRHP-listed		Cincinnati, Ohio	
Salem Methodist Church		built NRHP-listed		Cincinnati, Ohio	
Westwood United Methodist Church		built NRHP-listed		Cincinnati, Ohio	
Winton Place Methodist Episcopal Church		built NRHP-listed		Cincinnati, Ohio	
Pansy Methodist Church		built NRHP-listed		Clarksville, Ohio	
First Methodist Church (Cleveland, Ohio)		built NRHP-listed		Cleveland, Ohio	
St. John's AME Church		built NRHP-listed		Cleveland, Ohio	
Broad Street United Methodist Church		built NRHP-listed		Columbus, Ohio	
King Avenue United Methodist Church (Columbus, Ohio)		built NRHP-listed		Columbus, Ohio	
Methodist Episcopal Church (Crestline, Ohio)		built NRHP-listed		Crestline, Ohio	
Stratford Methodist Episcopal Church		built NRHP-listed		Delaware, Ohio	
First United Methodist Church		built NRHP-listed		Elyria, Ohio	
Old Methodist Church		built NRHP-listed		Fredericktown, Ohio	
Gates Mills Methodist Episcopal Church		built NRHP-listed		Gates Mills, Ohio	
Groveport United Methodist Church		built NRHP-listed		Groveport, Ohio	
Hilliard Methodist Episcopal Church		built NRHP-listed		Hilliard, Ohio	
First United Methodist Church		built NRHP-listed		London, Ohio	
York United Methodist Church		built NRHP-listed		Mallet Creek, Ohio	
Central United Methodist Church		built NRHP-listed		Mansfield, Ohio	
First Methodist Episcopal Church		built NRHP-listed		Massillon, Ohio	
The Methodist Episcopal Church of Painesville		built NRHP-listed		Painesville, Ohio	
United Methodist Church		built NRHP-listed		Mariemont, Ohio	
United Methodist Church (Mechanicsburg, Ohio)		built NRHP-listed		Mechanicsburg, Ohio	
United Methodist Church (Millersburg, Ohio)		built NRHP-listed		Millersburg, Ohio	
Pataskala United Methodist Church		built NRHP-listed		Pataskala, Ohio	
Bethel Methodist Episcopal Church		built NRHP-listed		Pleasant City, Ohio	
Bigelow United Methodist Church		built NRHP-listed		Portsmouth, Ohio	
Salem Methodist Episcopal Church		1910 built NRHP-listed	244 S. Broadway40°53′56″N 80°51′19″W	Salem, Ohio	Romanesque
St.Stephens' AME Church		built NRHP-listed		Sandusky, Ohio	
First Methodist Episcopal-Holy Trinity Greek Orthodox Church		built NRHP-listed		Steubenville, Ohio	
Pleasant Ridge United Methodist Church and Cemetery		built NRHP-listed		Tiffin, Ohio	
St. Paul AME Church		built NRHP-listed		Urbana, Ohio	
Mount Tabor Methodist Episcopal Church (West Liberty, Ohio)		built NRHP-listed		West Liberty, Ohio	
First United Methodist Church		1899 built 2006 NRHP-listed	136 N. Main St. 39°45′49″N 81°6′54″W	Woodsfield, Ohio	Romanesque, Late Gothic Revival
Brice United Methodist Church		built NRHP-listed		Brice, Ohio	

=== Oklahoma ===
Church	Image	Dates	Location	City, State	Description
First Methodist Church Building		1915 built 1980 NRHP-listed	West 1st Street	Atoka, Oklahoma	
Blackburn Methodist Church		1904 built 1984 NRHP-listed	319 North 9th Street	Blackburn, Oklahoma	
Methodist Episcopal Church, South		built NRHP-listed		Checotah, Oklahoma	
First United Methodist Church of Drumright		1927 built 1982 NRHP-listed	115 North Pennsylvania Avenue	Drumright, Oklahoma	Designed by F. A. Duggan
Methodist Episcopal Church, South		built NRHP-listed		Lawton, Oklahoma	
Methodist Church of Marshall		built NRHP-listed		Marshall, Oklahoma	
Mulhall United Methodist Church		built NRHP-listed		Mulhall, Oklahoma	
Ward Chapel AME Church		1904 built 1984 NRHP-listed	319 North 9th Street	Muskogee, Oklahoma	
Boston Avenue Methodist Episcopal Church		1929 built 1978 NRHP-listed; 1999 NHL	1301 South Boston Avenue; 36°8′38″N 95°59′4″W	Tulsa, Oklahoma	Art Deco building designed by architect Bruce Goff, built during 1927–1929; designated a U.S. National Historic Landmark
First Methodist-Episcopal Church, South		built NRHP-listed		Vinita, Oklahoma	
First United Methodist Church		built NRHP-listed		Walters, Oklahoma	

=== Oregon ===
Church	Image	Dates	Location	City, State	Description
Methodist Episcopal Church South		c. 1875 built 1979 NRHP-listed	238 E. 3rd Street; 44°38′9.2″N 123°6′7.8″W	Albany, Oregon	
Canyonville Methodist Church		1868 built 1984 NRHP-listed	2nd and Pine Streets; 42°55′38″N 123°16′49″W	Canyonville, Oregon	
Dayton Methodist Episcopal Church		1862 built 1987 NRHP-listed	302 4th Street	Dayton, Oregon	
Free Methodist Church		1885 built 1987 NRHP-listed	411 Oak Street; 45°13′19.3″N 123°4′49″W	Dayton, Oregon	
Echo Methodist Church		1886 built 1997 NRHP-listed	1 N. Bonanza Street; 45°44′34.1″N 119°11′41.4″W	Echo, Oregon	
Beulah Methodist Episcopal Church		1892 built 2002 NRHP-listed	242 N. Main Street; 44°51′58.3″N 123°25′54.1″W	Falls City, Oregon	
Willamette Station Site, Methodist Mission in Oregon		built NRHP-listed		Gervais, Oregon	
Methodist Episcopal Church of Goshen		built NRHP-listed		Goshen, Oregon	
Newman United Methodist Church		1889 built 1977 NRHP-listed	128 Northeast B Street; 42°26′34.6″N 123°19′27.6″W	Grants Pass, Oregon	
Jefferson Methodist Church		built NRHP-listed		Jefferson, Oregon	
Rock Creek Methodist Church		1850 built 1975 NRHP-listed		Molalla, Oregon	
Methodist Episcopal Church South		built 1922; NRHP-listed 1985	809 SE Main Street; 43°12′24″N 123°20′41″W	Roseburg, Oregon	
First Methodist Episcopal Church of Salem		1878 built 1973 NRHP-listed	600 State Street; 44°56′20.3″N 123°2′7.6″W	Salem, Oregon	
Troutdale Methodist Episcopal Church		1895 built 1993 NRHP-listed	302 SE Harlow St. 45°32′21″N 122°23′10.1″W	Troutdale, Oregon	

=== Pennsylvania ===
Church	Image	Dates	Location	City, State	Description
Philip G. Cochran Memorial United Methodist Church		1922 built 1984 NRHP-listed	Howell and Griscom Streets. 40°2′49″N 79°39′17″W	Dawson, Pennsylvania	Late Gothic Revival
St. George's Methodist Church		1767 built 1971 NRHP-listed	324 New Street; 39°57′17.9″N 75°8′46.82″W	Philadelphia, Pennsylvania	
Mount Hope United Methodist Church		1807 built	4020 Concord Road	Aston Township, Pennsylvania	
Siloam United Methodist Church		1852 built	3720 Foulk Road	Bethel Township, Delaware County, Pennsylvania	
Madison Street Methodist Episcopal Church		1878 built	701 Madison Street	Chester, Delaware County, Pennsylvania	
Union Methodist Episcopal Church		1889 built 1980 NRHP-listed	2019 West Diamond Street; 39°59′10″N 75°10′3″W	Philadelphia, Pennsylvania	Romanesque, Richardsonian Romanesque
Bethel A.M.E. Church		1837 built 1979 NRHP-listed 1996 PHMC-listed	119 North 10th Street	Reading, Pennsylvania	Now known as the Central Pennsylvania African American Museum
Methodist Episcopal Church of Burlington		1822 built 1990 NRHP-listed	US 6 at Township Road 357; 41°46′24″N 76°37′53″W	West Burlington, Pennsylvania	Greek Revival

=== Puerto Rico ===
Church	Image	Dates	Location	City, State	Description
Primera Iglesia Metodista Unida de Ponce		1907 built 1987 NRHP-listed	Calle Villa 135; 18°0′44″N 66°36′58″W	Ponce, Puerto Rico	Eclectic early 20th century work, important as first Puerto Rico design by Czech architect Antonin Nechodoma

=== Rhode Island ===
Church	Image	Dates	Location	City, State	Description
Saint Paul's United Methodist Church		1807 built		Newport, Rhode Island	
Warren United Methodist Church and Parsonage		1844 built 1971 NRHP-listed	41°43′49″N 71°17′2″W	Warren, Rhode Island	Greek Revival, Italian Villa

=== South Carolina ===
Church	Image	Dates	Location	City, State	Description
Bethel Methodist Church		1854 built 1975 NRHP-listed		Charleston, South Carolina	
Old Bethel United Methodist Church		built NRHP-listed		Charleston, South Carolina	
Bethel A.M.E. Church		1921 built 1982 NRHP-listed	1528 Sumter Street	Columbia, South Carolina	
Sidney Park Colored Methodist Episcopal Church		built NRHP-listed		Columbia, South Carolina	
Washington Street United Methodist Church		built NRHP-listed		Columbia, South Carolina	
Wesley Methodist Church		built NRHP-listed		Columbia, South Carolina	
McBee Methodist Church		built NRHP-listed		Conestee, South Carolina	
Conway Methodist Church		built NRHP-listed		Conway, South Carolina	
Allen Temple A.M.E. Church		built NRHP-listed		Greenville, South Carolina	
John Wesley Methodist Episcopal Church		1899 built 1978 NRHP-listed	101 E. Court Street34°50′52″N 82°23′55″W	Greenville, South Carolina	Gothic Revival and vernacular
Providence Methodist Church		built NRHP-listed		Holly Hill, South Carolina	
Shiloh Methodist Church		built NRHP-listed		Inman, South Carolina	
St. Paul's Methodist Church		built NRHP-listed		Little Rock, South Carolina	
Bethel African Methodist Episcopal Church		built NRHP-listed		McClellanville, South Carolina	
Monticello Methodist Church		built NRHP-listed		Monticello, South Carolina	
Mizpah Methodist Church		built NRHP-listed		Olar, South Carolina	
Trinity Methodist Episcopal Church		built NRHP-listed		Orangeburg, South Carolina	
White House United Methodist Church		built NRHP-listed		Orangeburg, South Carolina	
Appleby's Methodist Church		built NRHP-listed		St. George, South Carolina	
Central Methodist Church (Spartanburg, South Carolina)		built NRHP-listed		Spartanburg, South Carolina	
Spann Methodist Church and Cemetery		built NRHP-listed		Ward, South Carolina	

=== South Dakota ===
Church	Image	Dates	Location	City, State	Description
First United Methodist Church		built NRHP-listed		Aberdeen, South Dakota	
Sterling Methodist Church		built NRHP-listed		Bruce, South Dakota	
Esmond Methodist Episcopal Church and Township Hall		built NRHP-listed		Esmond, South Dakota	
Florence Methodist Church		built NRHP-listed		Florence, South Dakota	
Bethany United Methodist Church		built NRHP-listed		Lodgepole, South Dakota	
Oldham Methodist Church		built NRHP-listed		Oldham, South Dakota	
Methodist Episcopal Church (Pierre, South Dakota)		1910 built 1997 NRHP-listed	117 Central Ave., N. 44°22′16″N 100°21′12″W	Pierre, South Dakota	Late Gothic Revival
Dunlap Methodist Episcopal Church		built NRHP-listed		Platte, South Dakota	
Quinn Methodist Church		built NRHP-listed		Quinn, South Dakota	
Methodist Episcopal Church (Scotland, South Dakota)		1872 built 1979 NRHP-listed	811 6th St. 43°8′51″N 97°42′1″W	Scotland, South Dakota	Also known as Heritage Museum Chapel
First Methodist Episcopal Church		built NRHP-listed		Vermillion, South Dakota	
Methodist Episcopal Church of Wessington Springs		built NRHP-listed		Wessington Springs, South Dakota	
Underwood United Methodist Church		built NRHP-listed		White Lake, South Dakota	

=== Tennessee ===
Church	Image	Dates	Location	City, State	Description
Algood Methodist Church		1899 built 1979 NRHP-listed	158 Wall St.36°11′37″N 85°26′57″W	Algood, Tennessee	Late Victorian
Trinity United Methodist Church		built NRHP-listed		Athens, Tennessee	
Capleville Methodist Church		built NRHP-listed		Capleville, Tennessee	
Carthage United Methodist Church		built NRHP-listed		Carthage, Tennessee	
Charleston United Methodist Church and Cemetery		built NRHP-listed		Charleston, Tennessee	
Highland Park Methodist Episcopal Church		built NRHP-listed		Chattanooga, Tennessee	
Trinity Methodist Episcopal Church		built NRHP-listed		Chattanooga, Tennessee	
Wiley United Methodist Church		built NRHP-listed		Chattanooga, Tennessee	
Madison Street Methodist Church		built NRHP-listed		Clarksville, Tennessee	
Clarksville Methodist Church		built NRHP-listed		Clarksville, Tennessee	
St. Peter African Methodist Church		built NRHP-listed		Clarksville, Tennessee	
Broad Street United Methodist Church		built NRHP-listed		Cleveland, Tennessee	
College Grove Methodist Church		built NRHP-listed		College Grove, Tennessee	
First United Methodist Church of Columbia		built NRHP-listed		Columbia, Tennessee	
Cornersville Methodist Episcopal Church South		built NRHP-listed		Cornersville, Tennessee	
Culleoka Methodist Episcopal Church, South		built NRHP-listed		Culleoka, Tennessee	
Dancyville United Methodist Church and Cemetery		built NRHP-listed		Dancyville, Tennessee	
Decatur Methodist Church		built NRHP-listed		Decatur, Tennessee	
Mount Zion Methodist Episcopal Church South		built NRHP-listed		Fall River, Tennessee	
St. Paul African Methodist Episcopal Church		built 1913; NRHP-listed 2003		Fayetteville, Tennessee	
Trinity United Methodist Church		built NRHP-listed		Franklin, Tennessee	
First Methodist Church, Gatlinburg		built NRHP-listed		Gatlinburg, Tennessee	
Williamson Chapel CME Church Complex		built NRHP-listed		Greenlawn, Tennessee	
First Methodist Episcopal Church, South (Humboldt, Tennessee)		built NRHP-listed		Humboldt, Tennessee	
McKendree Methodist Episcopal Church		built NRHP-listed		Jasper, Tennessee	
Asbury Methodist Episcopal Church, South		1898 built 1997 NRHP-listed	35°57′13″N 83°49′33″W	Knoxville, Tennessee	Late Gothic Revival
Central United Methodist Church		built NRHP-listed		Knoxville, Tennessee	
Church Street Methodist Church		built NRHP-listed		Knoxville, Tennessee	
Lincoln Park United Methodist Church		built NRHP-listed		Knoxville, Tennessee	
New Salem United Methodist Church		built NRHP-listed		Knoxville, Tennessee	
Seven Islands Methodist Church		built NRHP-listed		Knoxville, Tennessee	
Trinity Methodist Episcopal Church		built NRHP-listed		Knoxville, Tennessee	
Pickett Chapel Methodist Church		built NRHP-listed		Lebanon, Tennessee	
First Methodist Church (McMinnville, Tennessee)		built NRHP-listed		McMinnville, Tennessee	
Collins Chapel CME Church and Site		built NRHP-listed		Memphis, Tennessee	
Martin Memorial Temple CME Church		built NRHP-listed		Memphis, Tennessee	
Union Avenue Methodist Episcopal Church, South		built NRHP-listed		Memphis, Tennessee	
Barrs Chapel C.M.E. Church		built NRHP-listed		Midway, Tennessee	
Allen Chapel A.M.E. Church		1889 built 1995 NRHP-listed	224 S. Maney Ave.38°50′38″N 86°23′14″W	Murfreesboro, Tennessee	Gable-end, Gothic Revival
Capers C.M.E. Church		built NRHP-listed		Nashville, Tennessee	
Elm Street Methodist Church (Nashville)		built NRHP-listed		Nashville, Tennessee	
Old Hickory Methodist Church		built NRHP-listed		Old Hickory, Tennessee	
Pikeville Chapel African Methodist Episcopal Zion Church		built NRHP-listed		Pikeville, Tennessee	
Pisgah United Methodist Church and Cemetery		built NRHP-listed		Pisgah, Tennessee	
Campbell Chapel African Methodist Episcopal Church		built NRHP-listed		Pulaski, Tennessee	
Olivet United Methodist Church, Parsonage and School		built NRHP-listed		Riversburg, Tennessee	
Henderson Chapel African Methodist Episcopal Zion Church		built NRHP-listed		Rutledge, Tennessee	
Oak Grove Methodist Church		built NRHP-listed		Ten Mile, Tennessee	
Mt. Zion Colored Methodist Episcopal Church		built NRHP-listed		Union City, Tennessee	
Verona United Methodist Church		1880 built 1985 NRHP-listed	724 John Lunn Road	Verona, Tennessee	Formerly Verona Methodist Episcopal Church, South
Evans Chapel United Methodist Church		built NRHP-listed		Waynesboro, Tennessee	
Bethlehem Methodist Church		1886 built 1989 NRHP-listed		Wildwood, Tennessee	
Smyrna First United Methodist Church		built NRHP-listed		Smyrna, Tennessee	

=== Texas ===
Church	Image	Dates	Location	City, State	Description
Anderson Camp Ground		1874 built 1982 NRHP-listed	31°57′14″N 95°37′23″W	Brushy Creek, Anderson County, Texas	Campground and structures
Wesley United Methodist Church		1865 founded 1929 built 1985 NRHP-listed	1164 San Bernard Street	Austin, Texas	
Chappell Hill Methodist Episcopal Church		built NRHP-listed		Chappell Hill, Texas	
Polk Street Methodist Church		built NRHP-listed		Amarillo, Texas	
Reedy Chapel-AME Church		built NRHP-listed		Galveston, Texas	
First United Methodist Church		built NRHP-listed		Paris, Texas	
First United Methodist Church		built NRHP-listed		San Marcos, Texas	
Marvin Methodist Episcopal Church, South		built NRHP-listed		Tyler, Texas	
Mount Vernon African Methodist Episcopal Church		built NRHP-listed		Palestine, Texas	
Webster Chapel United Methodist Church		built NRHP-listed		Victoria, Texas	
First Methodist Church (Cuero, Texas)		built NRHP-listed		Cuero, Texas	
First Methodist Episcopal Church of Tioga Center		built NRHP-listed		Tioga, New York	
First Methodist Church of Rockwall		built NRHP-listed		Rockwall, Texas	
First Methodist Church (Georgetown, Texas)		built NRHP-listed		Georgetown, Texas	
First Methodist Church (Marshall, Texas)		built NRHP-listed		Marshall, Texas	
Old First Methodist Episcopal Church South		built NRHP-listed		Wharton, Texas	
Methodist Church Concord		built NRHP-listed		Carthage, Texas	
Morning Chapel C.M.E. Church		built NRHP-listed		Fort Worth, Texas	
Grace Methodist Episcopal Church (Dallas, Texas)		built NRHP-listed		Dallas, Texas	
Mount Zion United Methodist Church		built NRHP-listed		Belton, Texas	
Mt. Zion Methodist Church		built NRHP-listed		Brenham, Texas	
Oak Lawn Methodist Episcopal Church, South		built NRHP-listed		Dallas, Texas	
Saint John's Methodist Church (Texas)		built NRHP-listed		Georgetown, Texas	
Saint John's Methodist Church (Stamford, Texas)		built NRHP-listed		Stamford, Texas	
Salado United Methodist Church		built NRHP-listed		Salado, Texas	
St. James Colored Methodist Episcopal Church		built NRHP-listed		Tyler, Texas	
Alamo Methodist Church		1912 built 1979 NRHP-listed	1150 South Alamo Street 29°24′40″N 98°29′34″W	San Antonio, Texas	Designed by Beverly Spillman in Mission/Spanish Revival style.

=== Utah ===
Church	Image	Dates	Location	City, State	Description
Copperton Community Methodist Church		built NRHP-listed		Copperton, Utah	
Corinne Methodist Episcopal Church		1870 built NRHP-listed	Corner of Colorado and South 600 Streets. 41°32′51″N 112°6′40″W	Corinne, Utah	
First Methodist Episcopal Church		1905 built 1995 NRHP-listed	200 South 200 East 40°46′24″N 111°54′29″W	Salt Lake City, Utah	Victorian and Eclectic style; also known as First Methodist Episcopal Church
Trinity A.M.E. Church		1909 built 1976 NRHP-listed		Salt Lake City, Utah	

=== Vermont ===
Church	Image	Dates	Location	City, State	Description
Hedding Methodist Church		c. 1895 built	40 Washington Street	Barre, Vermont	Queen Anne style, included in Barre Downtown Historic District
First Methodist Church of Burlington		1869 built 1978 NRHP-listed	South Winooski Avenue 44°28′43″N 73°12′38″W	Burlington, Vermont	Romanesque
Groton United Methodist Church			1397 Scott Hwy	Groton, Vermont	
Methodist Episcopal Church of Isle La Motte		1843 built 2001 NRHP-listed	67 Church Street 44°52′37″N 73°20′17″W	Isle La Motte, Vermont	Greek Revival
Methodist-Episcopal Church		built NRHP-listed		Stannard, Vermont	
Methodist Episcopal Church (Swanton, Vermont)		1895 built 2001 NRHP-listed	25 Grand Ave., Swanton Village44°55′7″N 73°7′30″W	Swanton, Vermont	Queen Anne
South Tunbridge Methodist Episcopal Church		built NRHP-listed		Tunbridge, Vermont	
Waterbury Center Methodist Church		built NRHP-listed		Waterbury Center, Vermont	
Wesleyan Methodist Church (Weybridge, Vermont)		built NRHP-listed		Weybridge, Vermont	
Methodist Episcopal Church of Winooski		built NRHP-listed		Winooski, Vermont	

=== Virginia ===
Church	Image	Dates	Location	City, State	Description
Springfield United Methodist Church	Springfield UM Church	built 1954	38.77813°N 77.18807°W	Springfield, Virginia	
Graysontown Methodist Church		built NRHP-listed		Graysontown, Virginia	
Main Street Methodist Episcopal Church South		built NRHP-listed		Danville, Virginia	
Butterwood Methodist Church and Butterwood Cemetery		built NRHP-listed		Blackstone, Virginia	
St. John's African Methodist Episcopal Church		built NRHP-listed		Norfolk, Virginia	
Thomas Methodist Episcopal Chapel		built NRHP-listed		Thaxton, Virginia	
Third Street Bethel A.M.E. Church		built NRHP-listed		Richmond, Virginia	
Trinity Methodist Church		built NRHP-listed		Richmond, Virginia	
Washington Street Methodist Church		built NRHP-listed		Petersburg, Virginia	
Zion Methodist Church		built NRHP-listed		Norfolk, Virginia	
Trinity United Methodist Church		built NRHP-listed		Ellett, Virginia	
Silverbrook Methodist Church		built NRHP-listed		Lorton, Virginia	
Epworth United Methodist Church		built NRHP-listed		Norfolk, Virginia	
Chilhowie Methodist Episcopal Church		built NRHP-listed		Chilhowie, Virginia	
Lomax African Methodist Episcopal Zion Church		built NRHP-listed		Arlington, Virginia	
Mt. Vernon Methodist Church		built NRHP-listed		Maces Spring, Virginia	
Monumental Methodist Church		built NRHP-listed		Portsmouth, Virginia	
Mt. Olive Methodist Episcopal Church		1890 built 2004 VLR-listed; 2005 NRHP-listed	20460 Gleedsville Road	Leesburg, Virginia	
Rocky Run Methodist Church		1857 built 1995 NRHP-listed 1995 VLR-listed	VA 616, near Alberta	Alberta, Virginia	
Court Street United Methodist Church		built	621 Court Street	Lynchburg, Virginia	

=== Washington ===
Church	Image	Dates	Location	City, State	Description
Claquato Church		c. 1858 built 1973 NRHP-listed	125 Water Street; 46°38′33″N 123°1′18″W	Claquato, Washington	Built in style of New England meeting houses, this is the oldest standing building in the state of Washington
Methodist Episcopal Church of Port Hadlock		1903 built 1983 NRHP-listed	Randolph and Curtiss Sts. 48°02′02.93″N 122°45′23.52″W	Hadlock, Washington	Now a residence, this was the first permanent Methodist church in Hadlock
First Methodist Protestant Church of Seattle		1906 built 1993 NRHP-listed	128 16th Ave. E. 47°37′11″N 122°18′37″W	Seattle, Washington	Also known as Capitol Hill United Methodist Church; now corporate headquarters of Catalysis
First African Methodist Episcopal Church		1912 built Seattle Landmark	1522 14th Avenue	Seattle, Washington	Not NRHP-listed
First United Methodist Church, now Daniels Recital Hall		1908 built 2011 NRHP-listed	811 5th Avenue 47°36′20″N 122°19′53″W	Seattle, Washington	Became a recital hall after nearly 25 years of conflict about its preservation
University Methodist Episcopal Church		1907 built Seattle Landmark	4142 Brooklyn Avenue N.E.	Seattle, Washington	Not NRHP-listed, no longer a Methodist church; upper portion is the non-denominational church, lower portion houses several restaurants
Tumwater Methodist Church		1872 built 1984 NRHP-listed	219 W. B St. 47°0′52″N 122°54′21″W	Tumwater, Washington	
Grace Evangelical Church of Vader		1902 built 2013 NRHP-listed	618 D. Street; 46°24′8″N 122°57′16″W	Vader, Washington	Gothic style

=== West Virginia ===
Church	Image	Dates	Location	City, State	Description
Andrews Methodist Church		1873 built 1970 NRHP-listed		Grafton, West Virginia	"Mother Church" of Mother's Day; a U.S. National Historic Landmark
Southern Methodist Church Building		built NRHP-listed		Buckhannon, West Virginia	
Simpson Memorial Methodist Episcopal Church		built NRHP-listed		Charleston, West Virginia	
Trinity Memorial Methodist Episcopal Church		built NRHP-listed		Clarksburg, West Virginia	
John Wesley Methodist Church		1820 built 1974 NRHP-listed		Lewisburg, West Virginia	
Lynch Chapel United Methodist Church		1902 built 2006 NRHP-listed		Morgantown, West Virginia	

=== Wisconsin ===
Church	Image	Dates	Location	City, State	Description
First Methodist Episcopal Church		1911 built 1999 NRHP-listed	421 S. Farwell St. 44°48′37″N 91°29′48″W	Eau Claire, Wisconsin	Late Gothic Revival
Court Street Methodist Church		built NRHP-listed		Janesville, Wisconsin	
Linden Methodist Church		built NRHP-listed		Linden, Wisconsin	
Highland Avenue Methodist Church		built NRHP-listed		Milwaukee, Wisconsin	
First Methodist Church		built NRHP-listed		Monroe, Wisconsin	
Old Plover Methodist Church		built NRHP-listed		Plover, Wisconsin	
Algoma Boulevard Methodist Church		built NRHP-listed		Oshkosh, Wisconsin	
First Methodist Church		c. 1875 built 1995 NRHP-listed	502 North Main Street	Oshkosh, Wisconsin	
Plum Grove Primitive Methodist Church		1882 built 1995 NRHP-listed		Ridgeway, Wisconsin	
First Methodist Church		1898 built 1983 NRHP-listed	121 Wisconsin Avenue	Waukesha, Wisconsin	Designed by architect Henry F. Starbuck in Romanesque style.

=== Wyoming ===
Church	Image	Dates	Location	City, State	Description
Methodist Episcopal Church (Buffalo, Wyoming)		1899 built 1976 NRHP-listed	Fort and N. Adams Sts.44°20′55″N 106°42′1″W	Buffalo, Wyoming	Akron plan design
First United Methodist Church		1867 founded 1890 built 1975 NRHP-listed	NE corner of 18th St. and Central Ave.41°8′7″N 104°48′53″W	Cheyenne, Wyoming	Congregation founded in 1867. Wild Bill Hickok was married in this church, in 1876. 1890 building is "semi-Gothic".

== See also ==
- List of Methodist churches, worldwide
- List of African Methodist Episcopal Churches
