= Scandinavian Methodist Church =

Historic church in Montana, United States

- U.S. National Register of Historic Places
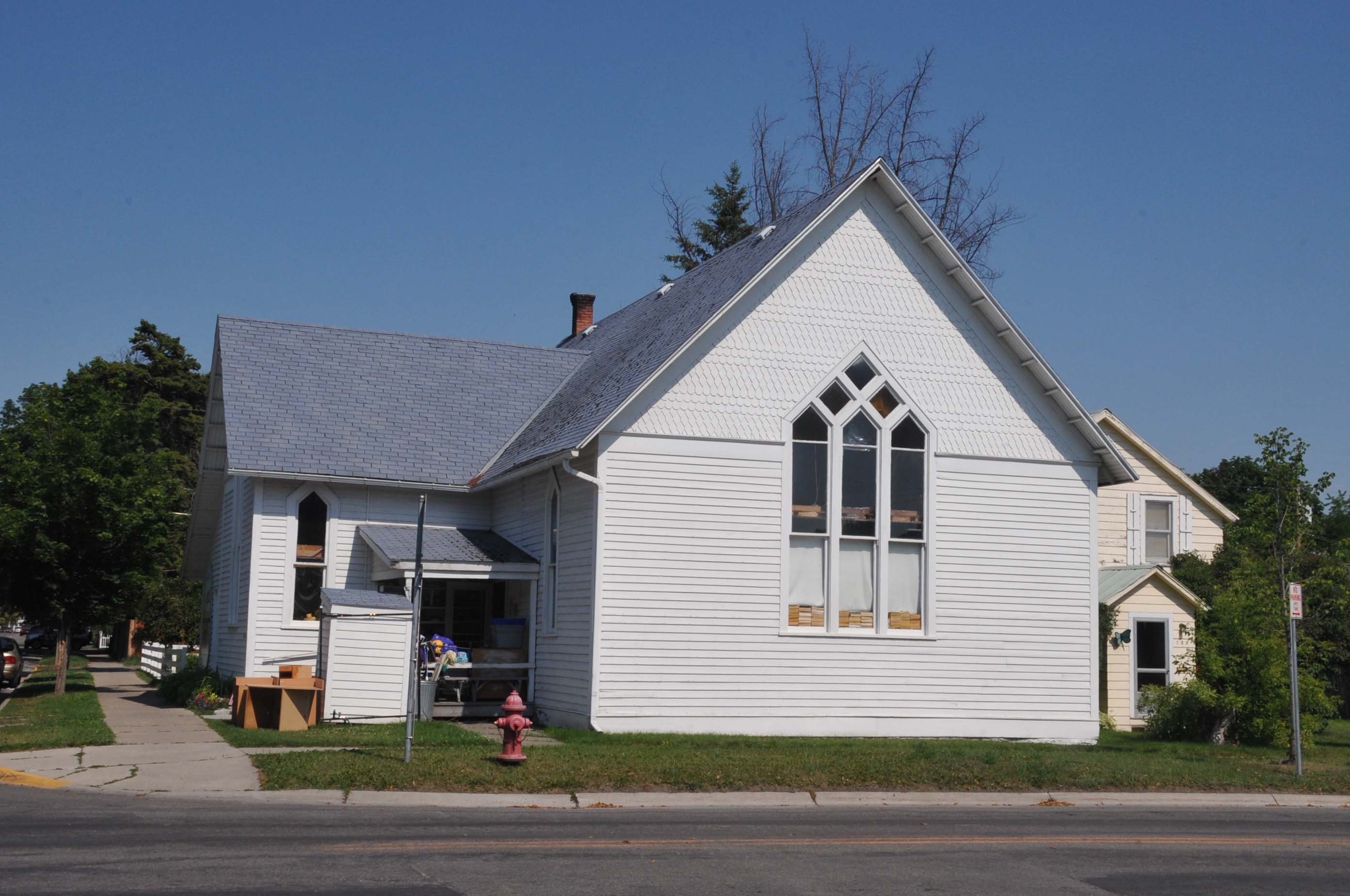

- Location within Montana Location within the United States
- Location: 203 Fifth Ave. W., Kalispell, Montana
- Coordinates: 48°11′43″N 114°19′9″W
- Area: less than one acre
- Built: 1896
- Built by: Nordtome, Robert
- Architectural style: Late Gothic Revival
- MPS: Kalispell MPS
- NRHP reference No.: 94000912
- Added to NRHP: August 24, 1994

Scandinavian Methodist Church is a historic Methodist church at 203 Fifth Avenue West Kalispell, Montana.

It was started in 1896 in a Late Gothic Revival style and was added to the National Register of Historic Places in 1994.

It was described in its NRHP nomination as "a good example of an early church in Kalispell with relatively simple details; almost all of the original wood frame churches have been demolished and replaced." It is a one-story wood building with one-over-one double-hung windows with pointed transoms. It had a steeple at its northwest corner which was removed sometime after 1955. It has clapboard siding and it has diamond and fishscale wood shingles in its gable ends. A rear wing was added sometime between 1903 and 1910; the north end of that rear wing had a wrap-around porch which was enclosed by 1955.
