= Bigelow United Methodist Church =

Historic church in Ohio, United States

- U.S. National Register of Historic Places
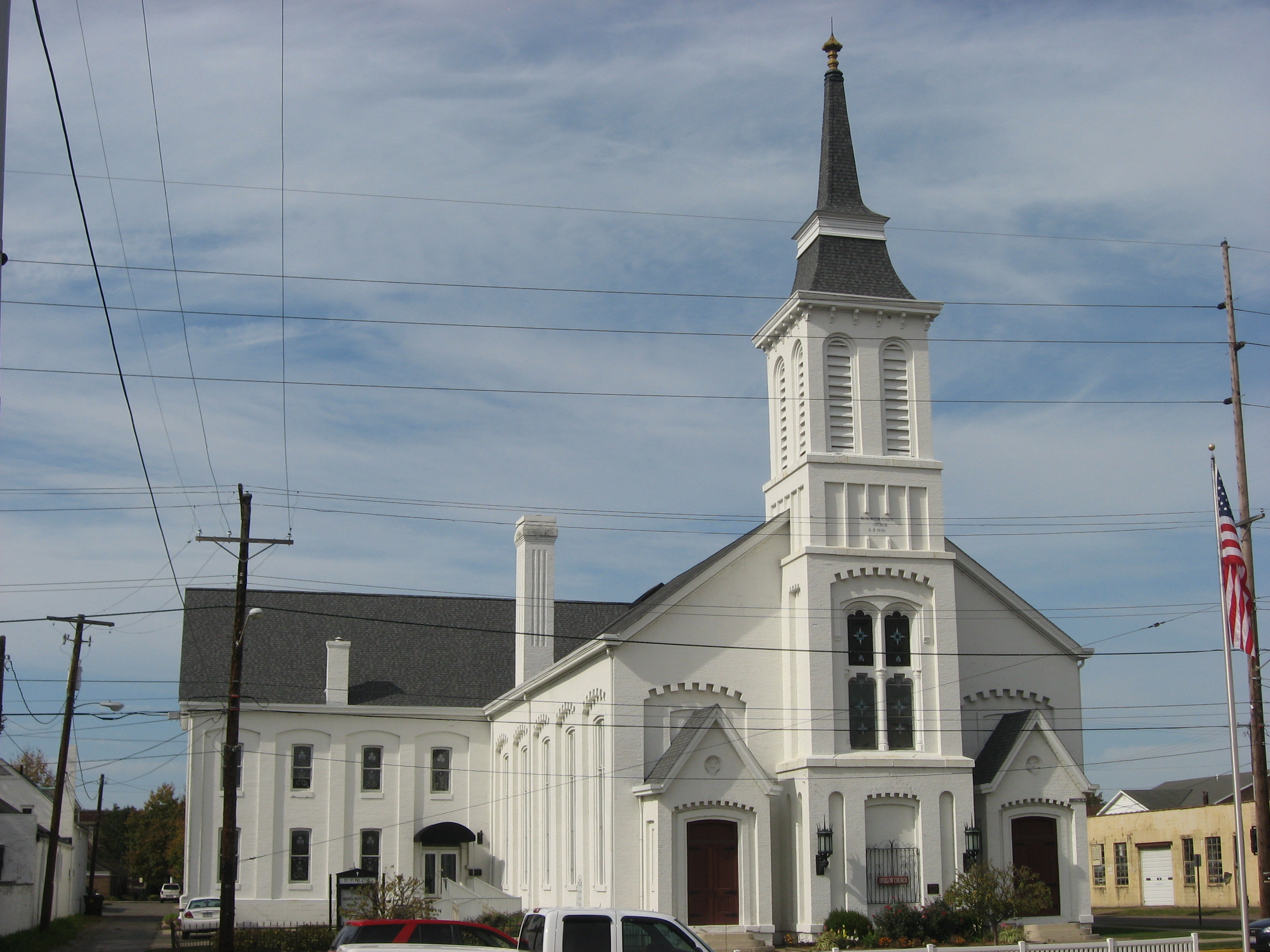
- Front of the church

- Location within Ohio Location within the United States
- Location: 415 Washington St., Portsmouth, Ohio
- Coordinates: 38°44′2″N 82°59′57″W
- Area: Less than 1 acre (0.40 ha)
- Built: 1858
- Architectural style: Early Romanesque Revival
- MPS: Boneyfiddle MRA
- NRHP reference No.: 87002073
- Added to NRHP: December 8, 1987

Bigelow United Methodist Church is a historic Methodist church in Portsmouth, Ohio. It was built in 1858 in an Early Romanesque Revival style and added to the National Register of Historic Places in 1987. The building is now known as the Grace Community Church at Bigelow.
