= Fourth Avenue Methodist Church =

Historic church in Kentucky, United States

- Fourth Avenue Methodist Episcopal Church
- U.S. National Register of Historic Places
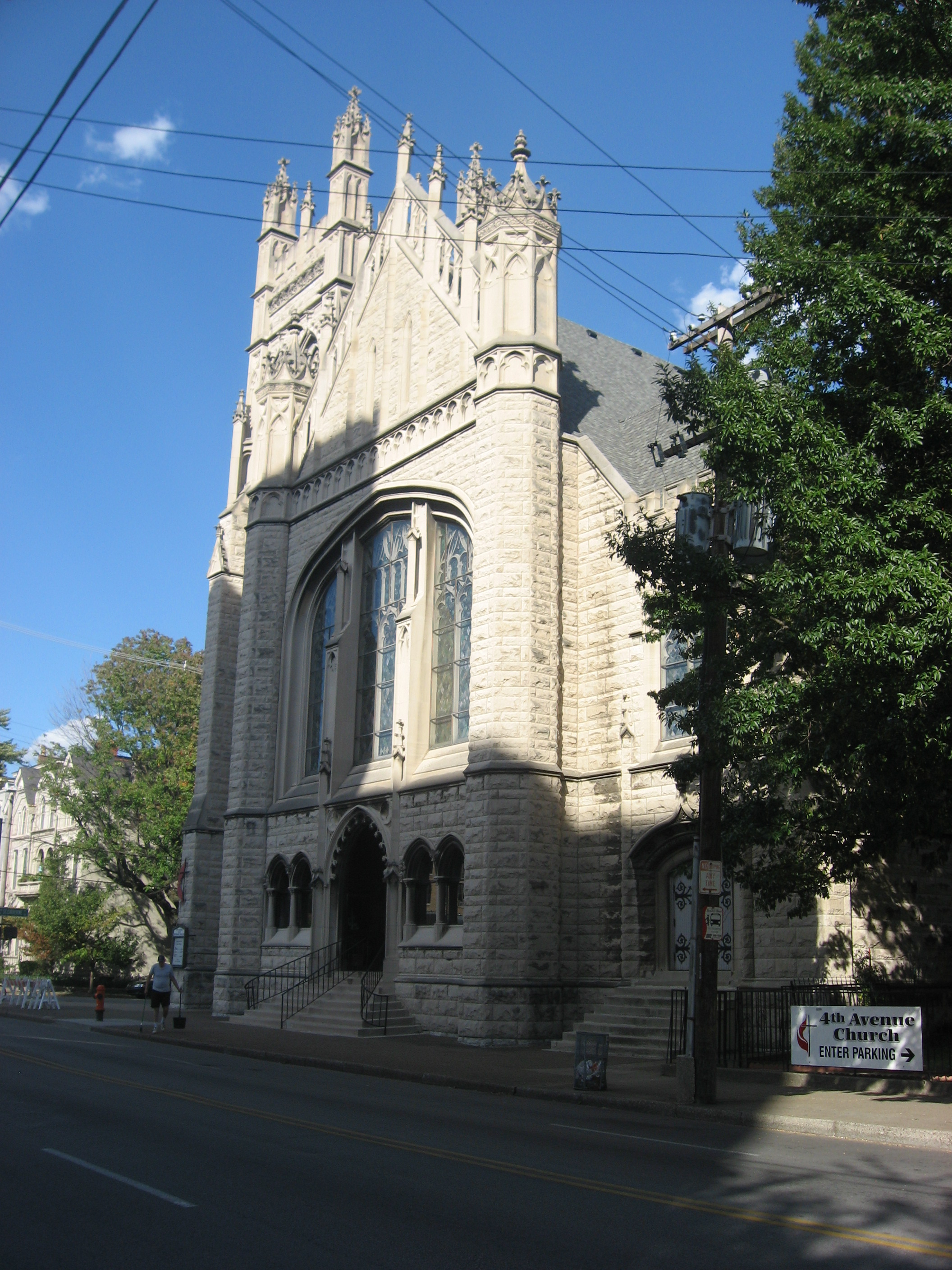
- Front of the church

- Location within Kentucky Location within the United States
- Location: 318 W. St. Catherine St., Louisville, Kentucky
- Coordinates: 38°14′13″N 85°45′34″W
- Area: less than one acre
- Built: 1900-02
- Architect: Dodd & Cobb
- Architectural style: Late Gothic Revival
- NRHP reference No.: 79001006
- Added to NRHP: July 16, 1979

Fourth Avenue Methodist Episcopal Church, also known as Fourth Avenue United Methodist Church, is a historic church at 318 W. St. Catherine Street, at the corner of Fourth Avenue, in Louisville, Kentucky. It was added to the National Register of Historic Places in 1979.

It was deemed significant as "an exceptional example of Gothic Revival ecclesiastical architecture." A part of the church was built in 1888, but the main facade and sanctuary were built during 1900–1902.
