= Lynch Chapel United Methodist Church =

Historic church in West Virginia, United States

- U.S. National Register of Historic Places
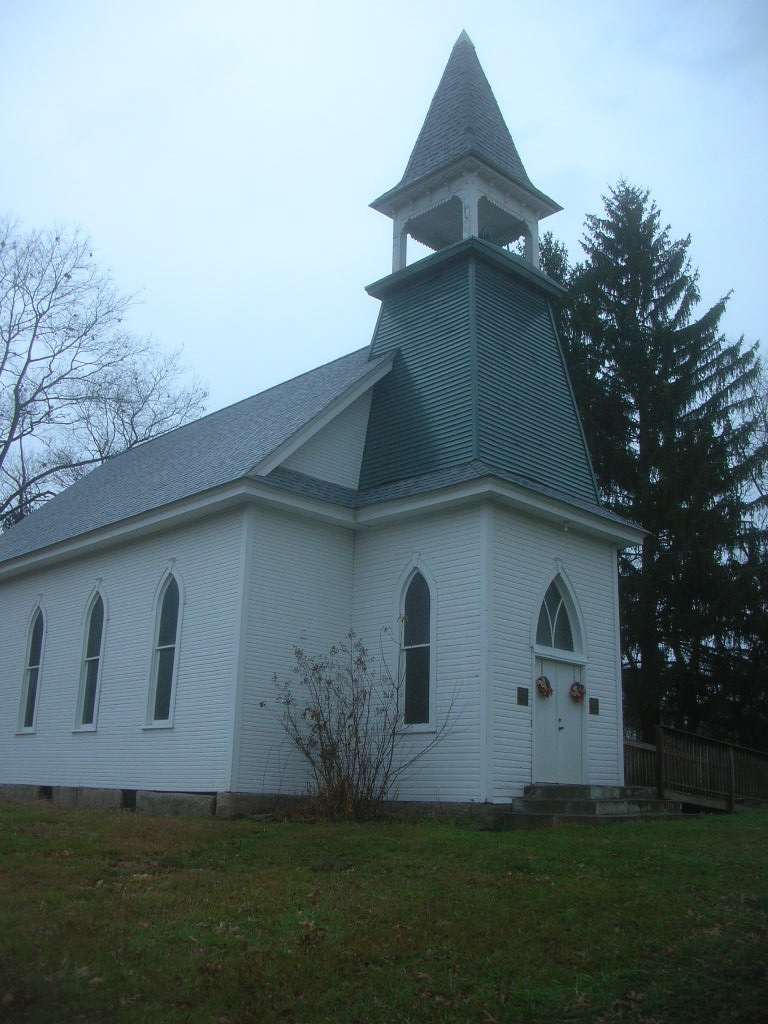

- Location within West Virginia Location within the United States
- Location: Junction of County Routes 32 and 41, near Morgantown, West Virginia
- Coordinates: 39°37′23″N 80°5′5″W
- Area: 1 acre (0.40 ha)
- Built: 1902
- Architectural style: Late Gothic Revival
- NRHP reference No.: 06001046
- Added to NRHP: November 15, 2006

Lynch Chapel United Methodist Church is a historic Methodist church located near Morgantown, Monongalia County, West Virginia. It was built in 1902, and is a small, one-story, rectangular church in the Late Gothic Revival style. It features a steeple bell tower with a pyramidal roof with folk Victorian accents such as delicate brackets and scrollwork.

It was listed on the National Register of Historic Places in 2006.
