= Methodist Episcopal Church South (Albany, Oregon) =

Historic church in Oregon, United States

- U.S. National Register of Historic Places
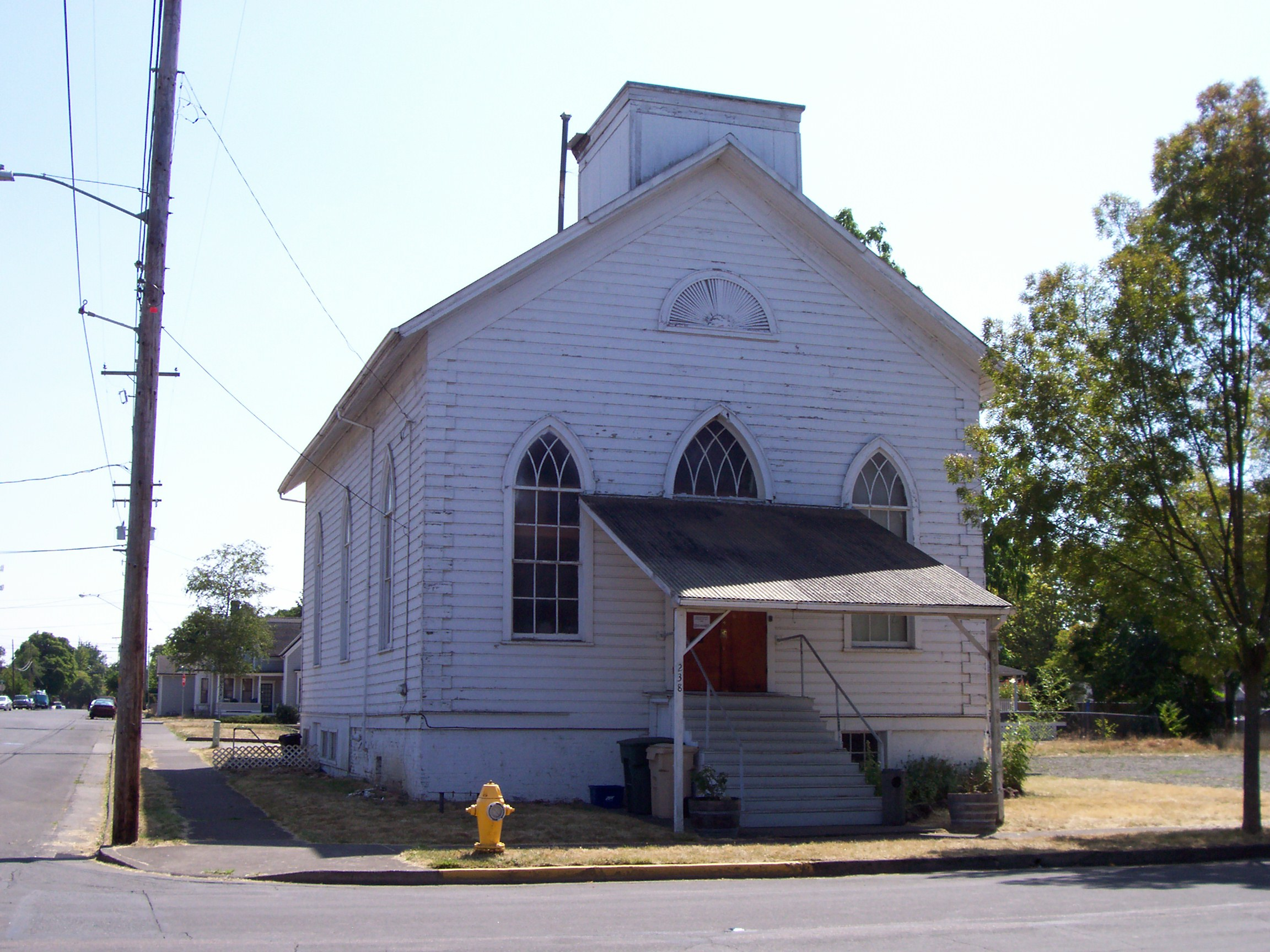
- Methodist Episcopal Church South in 2009

- Location within Oregon Location within the United States
- Location: 238 E. 3rd St, Albany, Oregon
- Coordinates: 44°38′9.2″N 123°6′7.8″W
- Area: less than one acre
- Built: c. 1875
- Architectural style: Classic Revival
- NRHP reference No.: 79002110
- Added to NRHP: November 16, 1979

Methodist Episcopal Church South (Bethesda Heritage Church) is a historic church at 238 E. 3rd Street in Albany, Oregon.

It was built circa 1875 and added to the National Register in 1979.
