= St. Peter A.M.E. Church =

Historic church in Louisiana, United States

- U.S. National Register of Historic Places
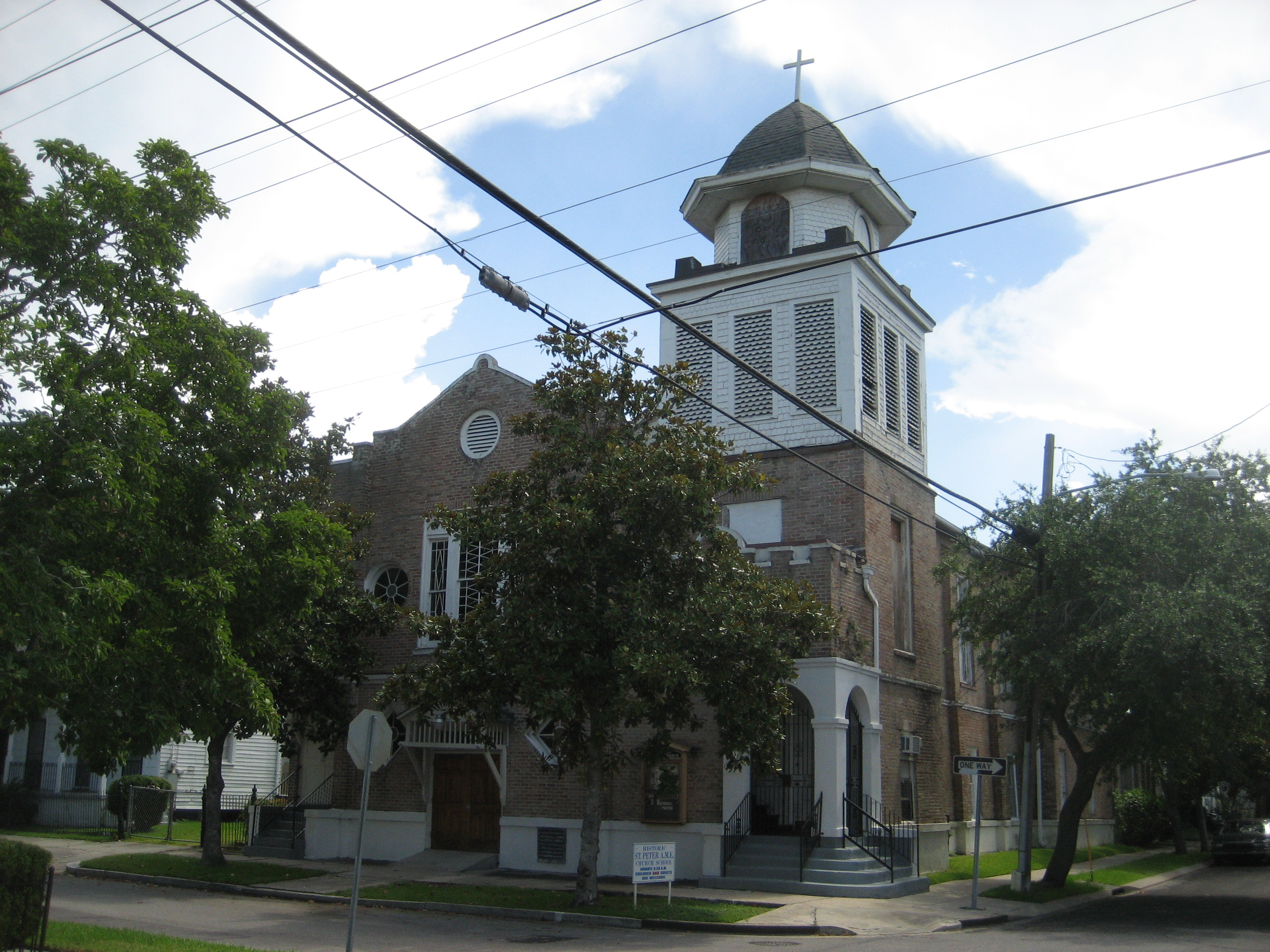

- Location within East New Orleans Location within Louisiana Location within the United States
- Location: 1201 Cadiz St., New Orleans, Louisiana
- Coordinates: 29°55′24″N 90°6′14″W
- Area: less than one acre
- Built: 1858
- Architect: Multiple
- NRHP reference No.: 79001077
- Added to NRHP: March 21, 1979

The St. Peter A.M.E. Church, or St. Peter African Methodist Episcopal Church, in New Orleans, Louisiana, is a historic church which was founded about 1850. It is one of the oldest black congregations in the New Orleans area. Its building, at 1201 Cadiz Street at the corner with Coliseum St., in a residential neighborhood, was built in 1858 was added to the National Register of Historic Places in 1979.

The church was deemed significant in black history, and architecturally, as "the present church building is one of the most outstanding black churches in the state. Although St. Peter's African Methodist Episcopal Church has been modified over the years, it retains a degree of architectural significance owing to its size and to its use of two high style features which are seldom found in black churches. These are the shingle style side tower and the relatively elaborate stained glass windows of the nave."
