= Clarksville Methodist Church =

Historic church in Tennessee, United States

- U.S. National Register of Historic Places
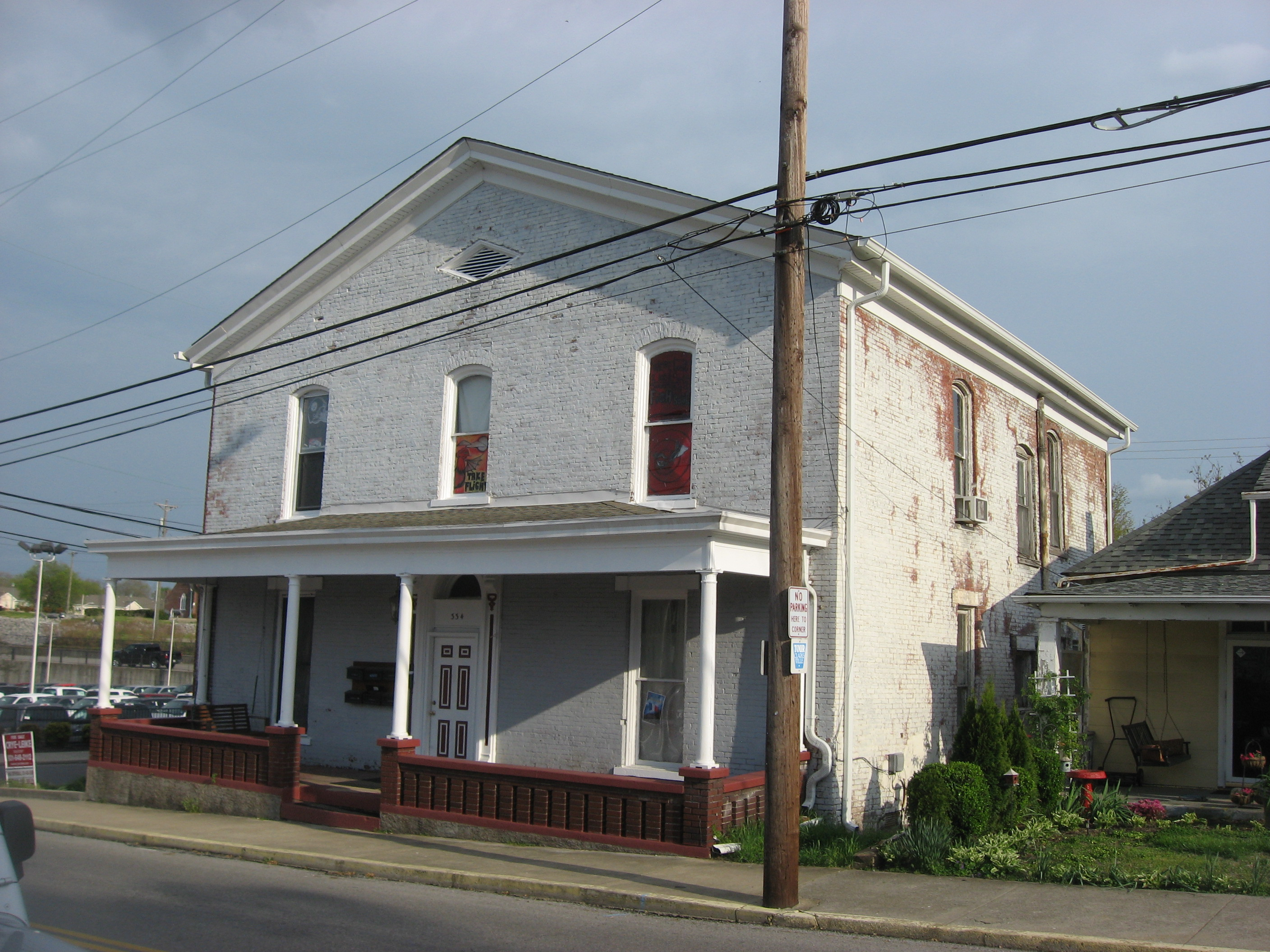
- Front and western side

- Location within Tennessee Location within the United States
- Location: 334 Main St., Clarksville, Tennessee
- Coordinates: 36°31′44″N 87°21′24″W
- Area: 0.3 acres (0.12 ha)
- Built: 1831
- MPS: Nineteenth Century Churches in Clarksville TR
- NRHP reference No.: 82004033
- Added to NRHP: April 06, 1982

Clarksville Methodist Church is a historic church building at 334 Main Street in Clarksville, Tennessee. Currently, the building isn't used as a church.

The church was built in 1831, the first permanent church building in Clarksville and one of the city's first brick buildings. In the 1880s, it ceased being used as a church and was converted into residential apartments. It is the only church building in Clarksville that was built before 1850 and is still standing.

The former church building was added to the National Register of Historic Places in 1982. At that time, it still housed residential apartments. A National Register nomination document stated that the building retained "much of its original architectural character" in spite of renovations.
