= Mt. Olive Methodist Episcopal Church =

Historic church in Virginia, United States

- U.S. National Register of Historic Places
- Virginia Landmarks Register
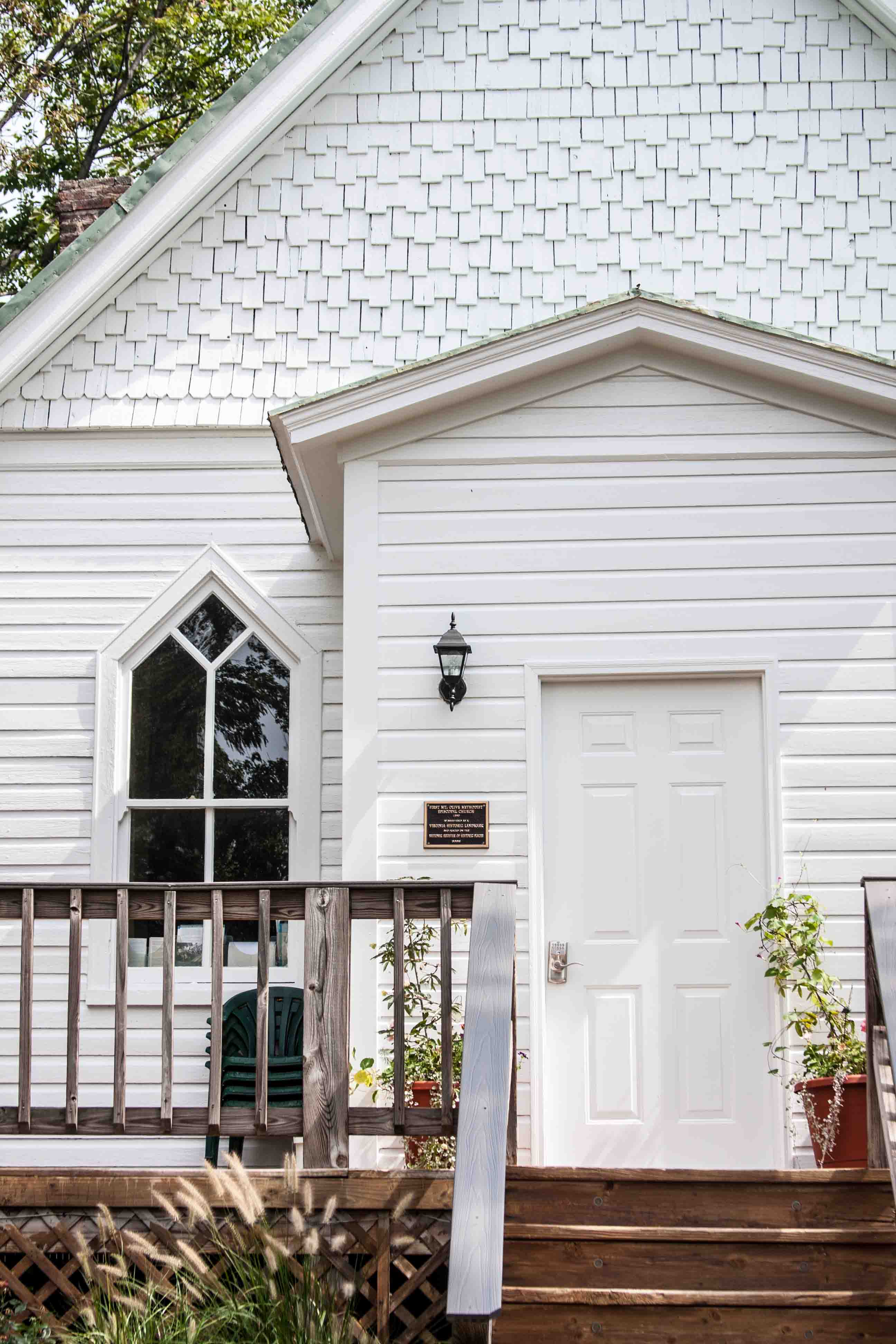
- Mt. Olive Methodist Episcopal Church, September 2012

- Location within Northern Virginia Location within Virginia Location within the United States
- Location: 20460 Gleedsville Rd., near Leesburg, Virginia
- Coordinates: 39°3′10″N 77°36′11″W
- Area: 0.5 acres (0.20 ha)
- Built: 1890
- Architectural style: Late Gothic Revival
- NRHP reference No.: 04001542
- VLR No.: 053-0994

Significant dates
- Added to NRHP: January 20, 2005
- Designated VLR: December 1, 2004

Mt. Olive Methodist Episcopal Church is a historic Methodist Episcopal church building in Leesburg, Virginia, United States. It was built in 1890 and is a one-story, wood-frame building in the Late Gothic Revival style. It sits on a fieldstone foundation and measures 23 feet wide and 42 feet deep.

It was listed on the National Register of Historic Places in 2005.
