= Highland Avenue Methodist Church =

Historic church in Wisconsin, United States

- U.S. National Register of Historic Places
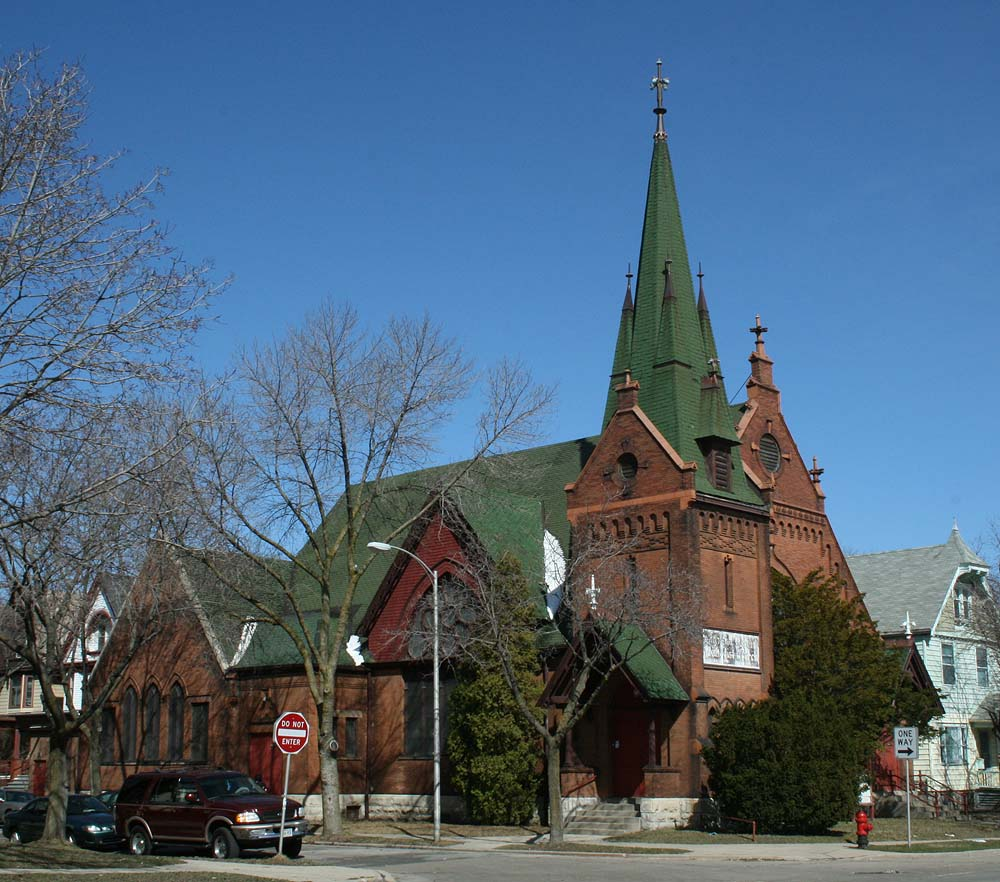

- Location within Wisconsin Location within the United States
- Location: 2024 W. Highland Ave., Milwaukee, Wisconsin
- Coordinates: 43°2′41″N 87°56′19″W
- Area: less than one acre
- Built: 1891, 1894
- Architect: Carl C. Barkhausen, Charles D. Crane
- Architectural style: Gothic Revival, German Gothic
- MPS: West Side Area MRA
- NRHP reference No.: 86000114
- Added to NRHP: January 16, 1986

The Highland Avenue Methodist Church in Milwaukee, Wisconsin, United States, is a Gothic Revival-styled church built in 1891 by Milwaukee's first German Methodist congregation. It was added to the National Register of Historic Places in 1986.

The congregation, founded in 1846, was the first German Methodist congregation in the state of Wisconsin, and the mother-church of that denomination in the state. The German Methodists in America were organized in a separate conference from the English-speaking Methodists until the two groups combined in 1933. The congregation built church buildings on North 5th Street in 1848 and West Juneau and 11th in 1872.

In 1896 the congregation built this church at Highland Avenue. Charles Crane and Carl Barkhausen designed the building in a German Gothic style, with a cross-shaped footprint, and a square corner tower. Walls are brick with corbeling and other decoration formed from brick and terra cotta. At the center of the main facade is a large arch containing various stained glass windows. The steeple on the tower transitions in an interesting way from a square tower to an octagonal spire. Inside, the lectern, table and choir are on a raised dais in the corner, with the pews arranged around it in concentric arcs.

When the Highland Ave. church was built in 1891, the congregation was changing from German to English services. The whole German Methodist conference merged with other U.S. Methodists in 1933. The Highland Avenue congregation dissolved in the 1960s. After that a black congregation moved into the building, then the Church for All People, then the Solomon Community Temple, and as of 2019 the Rehoboth New Life Center.

The church building is the only one known to have been designed by the Milwaukee architectural firm Crane and Barkhausen, which specialized in schools and residences. It was placed on the NRHP as an important example of German Gothic style and because of its connection to the mother congregation of German Methodism in the state.
