= Wesley Temple AME Church =

Historic church in Ohio, United States

- Wesley Temple AME Zion Church
- U.S. National Register of Historic Places
- Location within Ohio Location within the United States
- Location: 104 N. Prospect St., Akron, Ohio, United States
- Coordinates: 41°5′10″N 81°30′38″W
- Area: less than one acre
- Built: 1928
- Architect: Wardner, Herbert L.; Sommerville, John O.
- Architectural style: Classical Revival
- NRHP reference No.: 94000243
- Added to NRHP: March 17, 1994

Wesley Temple AME Zion Church is a historic church at 104 N. Prospect Street in Akron, Ohio, United States.

It was built in 1928 and added to the National Register in 1994. The Current Pastor of the Church is Rev. George William Whitfield.
