= Epworth Methodist Evangelical Church =

Historic church in Kentucky, United States

- U.S. National Register of Historic Places
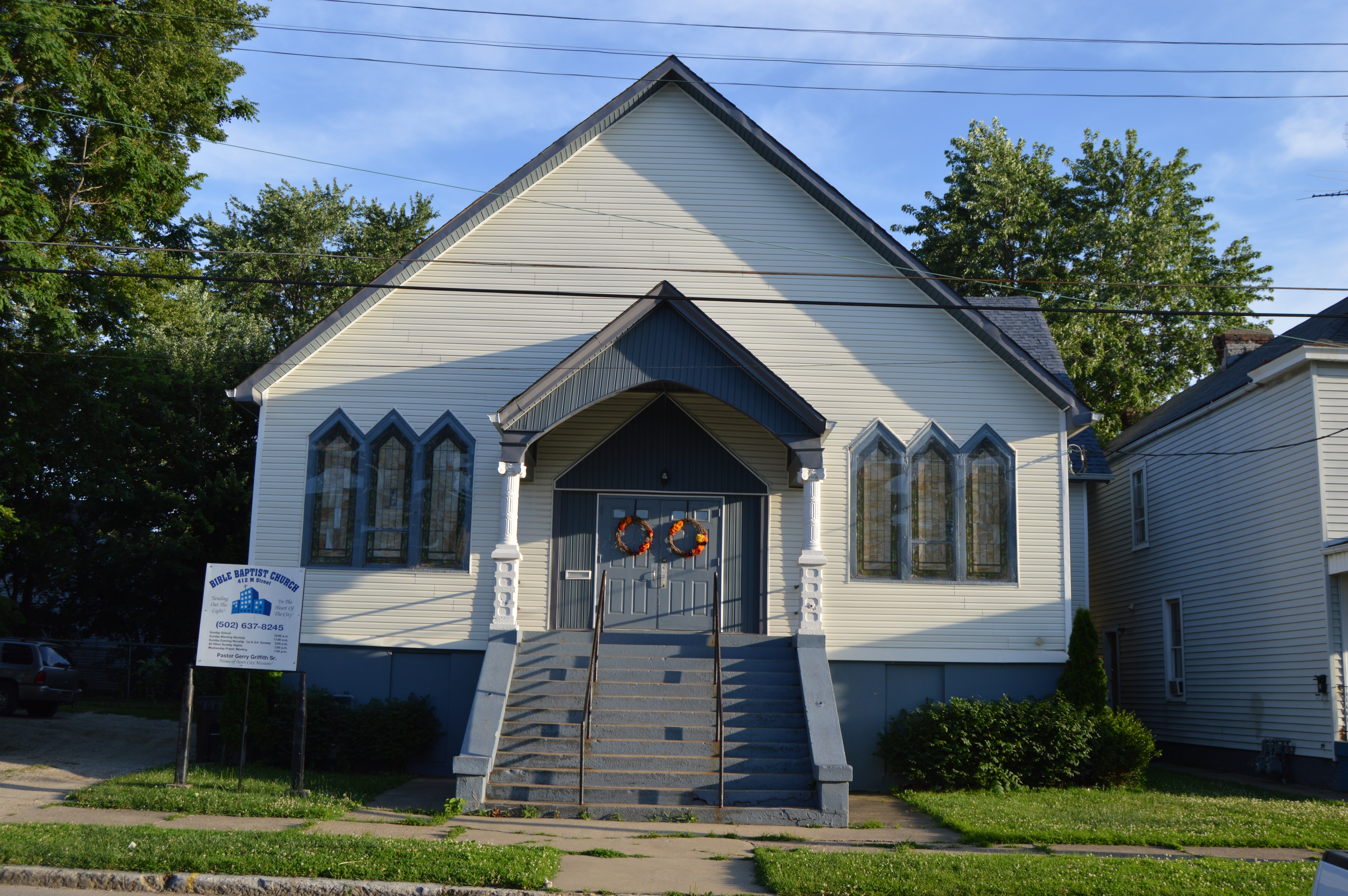
- Front of the church

- Location within Kentucky Location within the United States
- Location: 412 M. St., Louisville, Kentucky
- Coordinates: 38°12′32″N 85°45′56″W
- Area: less than one acre
- Built: 1895
- Architectural style: Gothic Revival
- MPS: South Louisville MRA
- NRHP reference No.: 83002661
- Added to NRHP: September 6, 1983

Epworth Methodist Evangelical Church, also known as Trinity Baptist Temple, is a historic Gothic Revival church at 412 M. Street in Louisville, Kentucky. It was built in 1895 and added to the National Register of Historic Places in 1983.

It is a one-story gable-front building. In 1983 it was the oldest of six surviving frame Gothic Revival churches in Louisville.
