= St. Paul's Methodist Episcopal Church (Hartford, Connecticut) =

Historic church in Connecticut, United States

- U.S. National Register of Historic Places
- U.S. Historic district – Contributing property
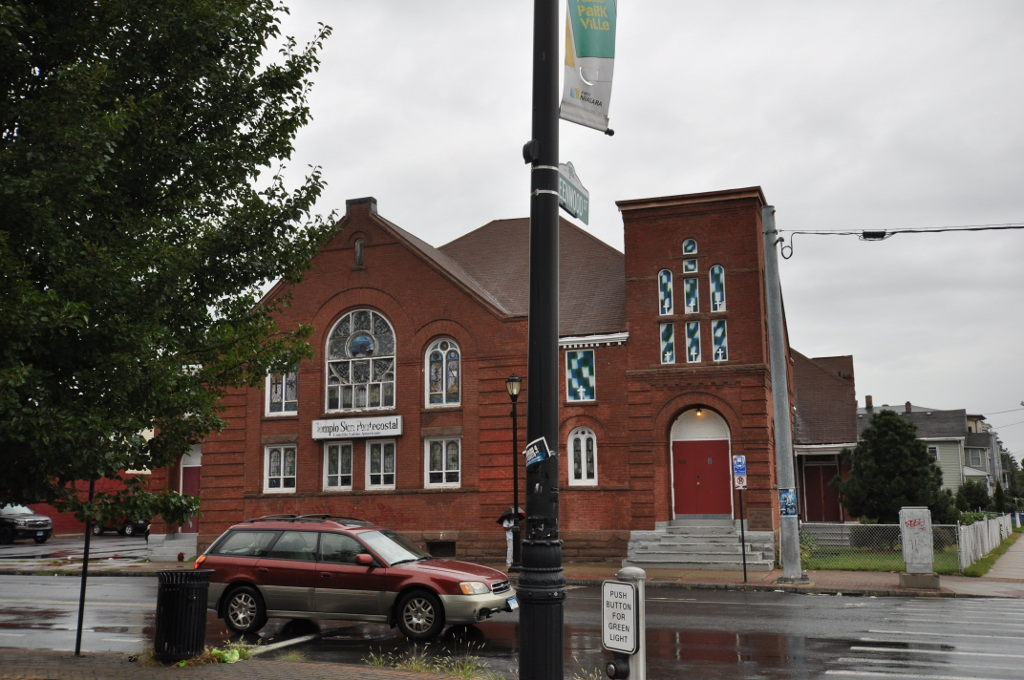

- Location within Connecticut Location within the United States
- Location: 1886-1906 Park Street, Hartford, Connecticut
- Coordinates: 41°45′24″N 72°42′37″W
- Area: 1 acre (0.40 ha)
- Built: 1900
- Architect: Kramer, George W.
- Architectural style: Romanesque
- Part of: Parkville Historic District (ID15000112)
- NRHP reference No.: 84001051

Significant dates
- Added to NRHP: August 2, 1984
- Designated CP: March 31, 2015

St. Paul's Methodist Episcopal Church, known more recently as the Templo Sion Pentecostal Church, is a historic church at 1886-1906 Park Street in Hartford, Connecticut, United States. Built in 1900, it is a good example of Romanesque Revival design. It was built for a working-class congregation to a design by the nationally known church architect George W. Kramer, proponent of the Akron plan of church interiors, which this one follows. The church was added to the National Register of Historic Places in 1984.

== Description and history ==
The church formerly known as St. Paul's is located in Hartford's Parkville neighborhood, on the north side of Park Street at its junction with Amity Street. It is a modestly scaled brick building, with complex hipped roof arrangement that includes large gables facing both Park and Amity. The Park Street facade is asymmetrical, with a large square tower on the right housing the main entrance, and a smaller one on the left. The gable in between has a band of four square stained glass windows, surmounted by a trio of arched windows, the largest in the center. The flanking tower each have entrances deeply recessed under round arches.

The Parkville area developed as an industrial village beginning in the 1870s, experiencing its greatest growth between 1890 and the First World War. St. Paul's was organized in 1891 as a daughter congregation of the South Park Methodist Church, meeting first in private residences and later in a frame church built in 1894. By 1898 the congregation was too large for that building, and the present building was commissioned. It was formally dedicated in 1900. The church tower's upper levels were extensively damaged by the New England Hurricane of 1938, and were removed, leaving the present squat configuration. An extension to the rear was added in the 1950s to provide space for Sunday School instruction.

The church congregation merged with the First United Methodist Church in 1975, and moved into the latter's facilities. This building stood vacant for a time, and was purchased in 1979 by the Templo Sion Pentecostal Church, its present occupant.

== See also ==
- National Register of Historic Places listings in Hartford, Connecticut
