= George W. Kramer =

American architect

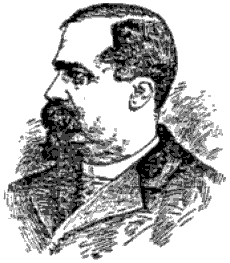
- Born: George Washington Kramer; July 9, 1847; Ashland, Ohio
- Died: October 20, 1938 (aged 91); East Orange, New Jersey
- Occupation: Architect

George Washington Kramer (1847 – 1938) was an American architect. He worked both independently and in the partnership of Weary & Kramer with Frank O. Weary.

== Biography ==
George W. Kramer was born in Ashland, Ohio on July 9, 1847.

He retired in 1924, and died at his home in East Orange, New Jersey on October 20, 1938.

== Works ==
A number of his works are listed on the National Register of Historic Places, including:

- Andrews United Methodist Church, 95 Richmond St. Brooklyn, New York
- Baptist Temple, 360 Schermerhorn St. Brooklyn, New York
- Bay Ridge United Methodist Church, 7002 Fourth St. Brooklyn, New York
- One or more works in Birmingham Green Historic District, roughly bounded by Fifth, Caroline, Fourth and Olivia Sts. Derby, Connecticut
- Duke Memorial United Methodist Church, 504 W. Chapel Hill St. Durham, North Carolina
- One or more works in Findlay Downtown Historic District, roughly along Main, W. Sandusky and W. Main Cross Sts. Findlay, Ohio
- First United Methodist Church, 6th Ave. and 19th St., N Birmingham, Alabama
- First United Methodist Church, jct. of Prince and Clifton Sts., NW corner Conway, Arkansas
- First United Methodist Church, 226 E. Lincoln Ave. Mount Vernon, New York
- Second Presbyterian Church, 801 Waller St. Portsmouth, Ohio
- St. Luke's Methodist Episcopal Church, 1199 Main St. Dubuque, Iowa
- St. Paul's Methodist Episcopal Church, 1886-1906 Park St. Hartford, Connecticut

=== Other works ===
- First St. John Methodist Church, 1601 Clay St. San Francisco, California. Demolished May 16, 2014.
