= Frank O. Weary =

American architect

Frank Orlando Weary (1849 – 1921) was an architect based in Akron, Ohio. He joined in the partnership Weary & Kramer with George W. Kramer. Weary designed the Carroll County Courthouse in Carrollton, Ohio in Second Empire style, which was recognized by listing on the National Register of Historic Places in 1974. He also designed the Akron Public Library (1904), a Carnegie library, also listed on the National Register. His brother Edwin D. Weary was also an architect, known for designing bank buildings in Chicago and partnering with W. H. Alford at Weary and Alford.

== Biography ==
Weary was born in Sheboygan, Wisconsin in 1849 and moved with his family to Akron in 1851. Simon B. Weary, a carpenter and then wood product company owner, was his father.

From 1863, Weary served as a drummer boy in the Union Army during the American Civil War. He married Jennie Wise in 1881. They had four children.

Architectural drawing from the Historic American Buildings Survey for The Gothic Building

Weary designed the Selle Wagon and Wheel Company building that became part of Selle Gear Works, Akron-Selle, and is now the home of Ohio Brewing Company.

== Weary & Kramer ==
Weary partnered with George W. Kramer to form the firm Weary and Kramer, which also produced several NRHP listed buildings.

== Works ==
- Akron Public Library, 69 East Market Street in Akron, Ohio NRHP listed
- Carroll County Courthouse (Ohio) at Courthouse Square in Carrollton, Ohio, NRHP listed
- First Methodist Episcopal Church, 120 Cleveland Ave., SW Canton, Ohio, NRHP listed

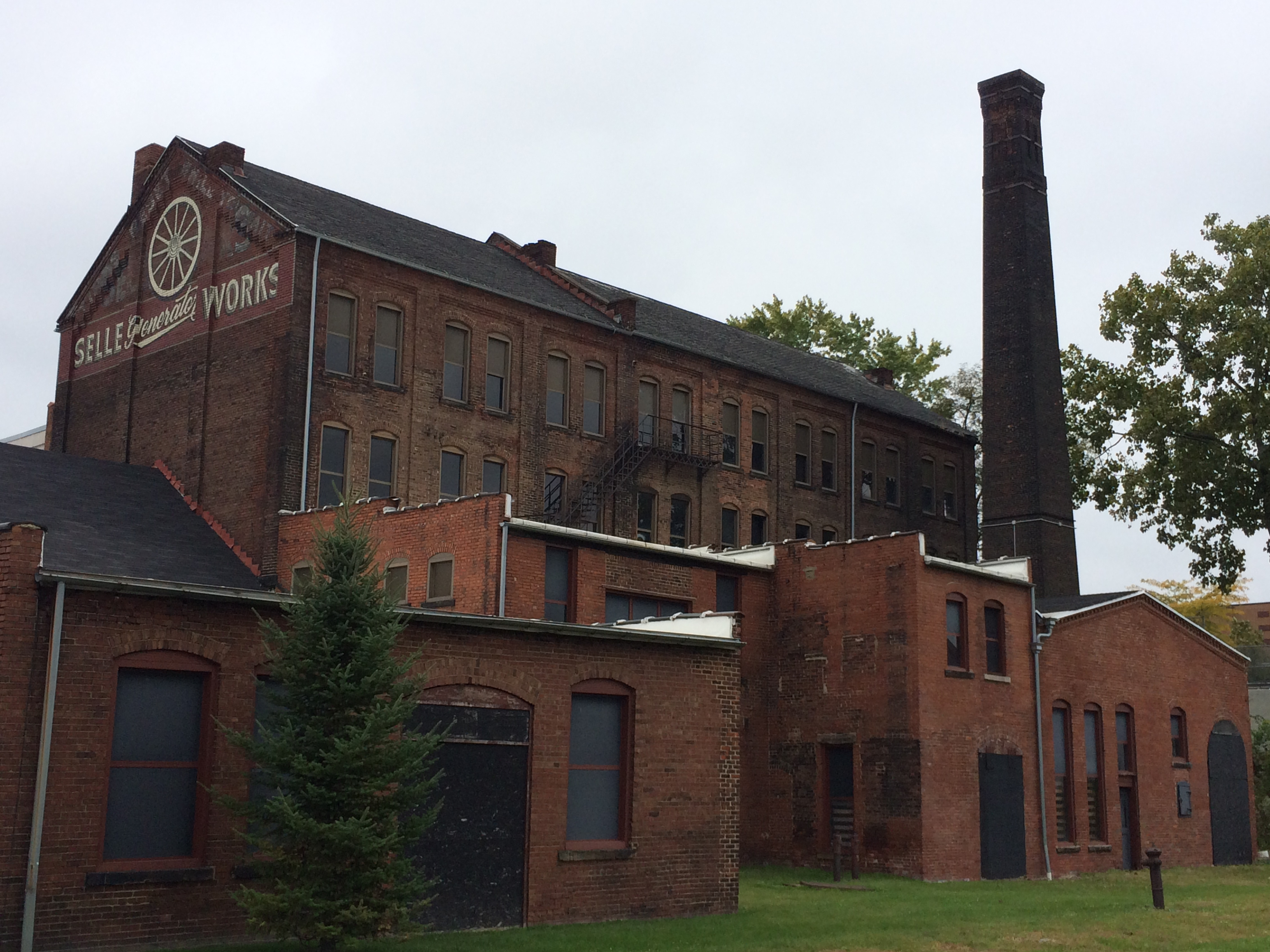
Selle Generator Works building and other Selle Gear Company buildings

- The Gothic Building (1902) at 102 S. High St. & 52-58 E. Mill St. in Akron, NRHP listed
- Selle Gear Company, 451 S. High Streer in Akron, NRHP listed
- Residence of A and M. J. Allen (1878) in Akron
- Akron Rural Cemetery Buildings at 150 Glendale Avenue in Akron Weary, NRHP listed
  - Glendale Cemetery Memorial Chapel
  - Soldiers lodge and memorial chapel
- Akron Savings Bank building
- Beacon Block at Main Street and Mill Street
- Central High School (Akron, Ohio)
- Soldiers Memorial in Akron

== Weary and Kramer ==
(with attribution)

- Hancock County Courthouse in Courthouse Square, Findlay, Ohio, NRHP-listed
- Andrews United Methodist Church at 95 Richmond Street in Brooklyn, New York (Kramer & Weary), NRHP-listed
- First United Methodist Church (Birmingham, Alabama), 6th Ave. and 19th St., N.
- Baptist Temple at 360 Schermerhorn Street in Brooklyn, New York, NRHP-listed
- One or more works in Findlay Downtown Historic District, Findlay, Ohio (Weary & Kramer), NRHP-listed
