= Historic Presbyterian Community Center (Madison, Nebraska) =

Historic church in Nebraska, United States

- First United Presbyterian Church
- U.S. National Register of Historic Places
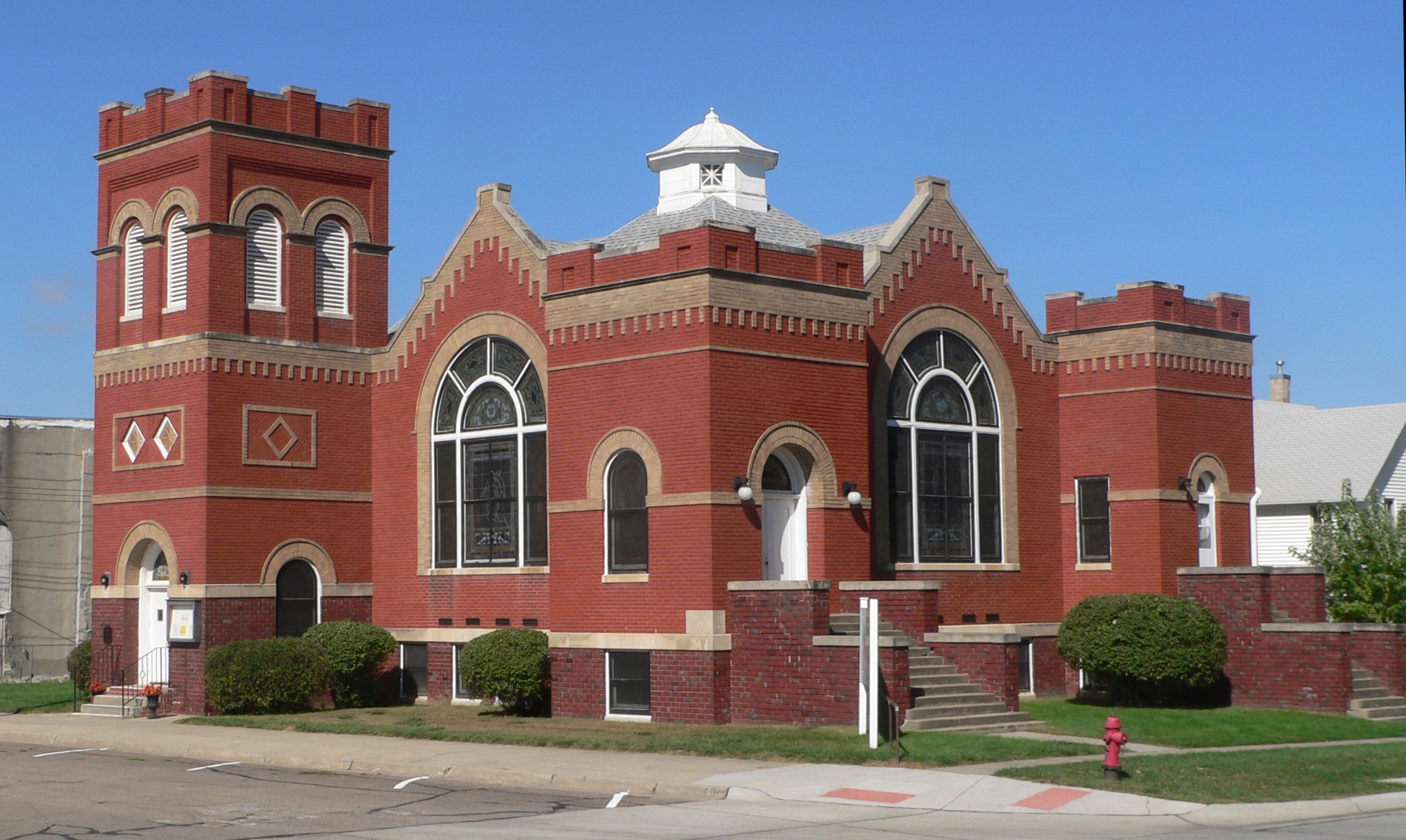
- View from the southeast

- Location within Nebraska
- Location: 104 E. 4th Street, Madison, Nebraska
- Coordinates: 41.827263°N 97.454077°W
- Built: 1914
- Architectural style: Romanesque Revival
- NRHP reference No.: 08001134
- Added to NRHP: Dec. 3, 2008

The Historic Presbyterian Community Center, formerly the First Presbyterian Church, is a former church building in the city of Madison, in the northeastern part of the state of Nebraska, in the Midwestern United States.

The building was constructed in 1914 to serve a Presbyterian congregation. It remained in service until 2007, when the dwindling of the congregation made it impossible to continue supporting the building as a church. It was then acquired by a local nonprofit organization, which uses it for concerts, plays, art exhibits, and other community events; it is also used for events such as weddings and funerals.

The building was designed in a Romanesque Revival architectural style. Its interior was configured according to the Akron plan, a scheme for laying out Sunday-school rooms that was in widespread use through much of the final third of the 19th century. Because of its exterior and interior design, it was listed in the National Register of Historic Places, under the name First United Presbyterian Church.

== History ==
=== Barnes settlement ===
The first white settlers to occupy the Madison area were a party led by Henry Mitchell Barnes. Attracted by news that fertile prairie land was available in the Nebraska Territory, Barnes left his home in Poughkeepsie, New York; with his sons William J. Barnes and Frank W. Barnes, and his nephew Peter J. Barnes, he traveled by rail to Columbus, Nebraska in 1866. In December of that year, they investigated the area lying between Columbus and the Elkhorn River before returning to Columbus for the rest of the winter.

In May 1867, the Barnes party returned north with a herd of cattle and two wagons, whose cargo included building materials for a frame house, and settled near the junction of Union and Taylor Creeks. Henry, William, and Frank Barnes each claimed a quarter-section (160 acres, or 65 ha). They built a log bridge across Union Creek, and Henry Barnes built himself a frame house, using the material that they had brought north from Columbus. During the remainder of 1867, several additional families located in and near the Union Creek settlement.

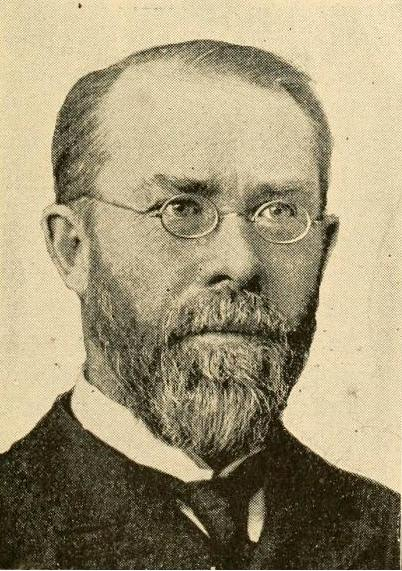
Sheldon Jackson

Soon after the Barnes party settled on the site, Presbyterian services were held in Henry Barnes's and other settlers' houses. In 1869, a trio of Iowa presbyteries appointed Rev. Sheldon Jackson superintendent of missions for Iowa, Nebraska, Dakota, Idaho, Montana, Wyoming, and Utah; in 1870, Jackson, accompanied by Rev. J. M. Wilson of Columbus, visited Madison to organize the congregation. Services were held in Madison's schoolhouse, built earlier in 1870.

=== 1870–1900 ===
The Union Creek settlement continued to grow. In 1870 or 1871, the town of Madison was platted on Frank Barnes's land. Soon thereafter, the Presbyterian congregation decided to build a church. Lumber for construction was hauled some 35 miles (55 km) from Columbus by ox-drawn wagons; the new church was dedicated in May 1872.

The church was the site of Madison's first fair, held in September 1873 and attended by 50–60 people. In 1876, it acquired Madison County's first church bell, donated by Henry Barnes.

In September 1881, the church was destroyed by a tornado. After the storm, the church's bell was recovered from a building across the street. Only the church's west wall survived; on it, an American flag that had been hung for a memorial service for the recently deceased James Garfield remained undamaged. Rather than rebuilding on the site, the congregation sold the land and used the proceeds to build at a new location. The new church, dedicated in 1882, cost $2,000.

In 1894, a bell tower was added to the church, and the building was rededicated. In 1897 or 1898, the congregation, which had up to that time been supported by funds from the national Board of Home Missions, elected to become self-supporting. As part of this, the congregation determined to raise $900 for the pastor's salary.

=== 1914 church ===
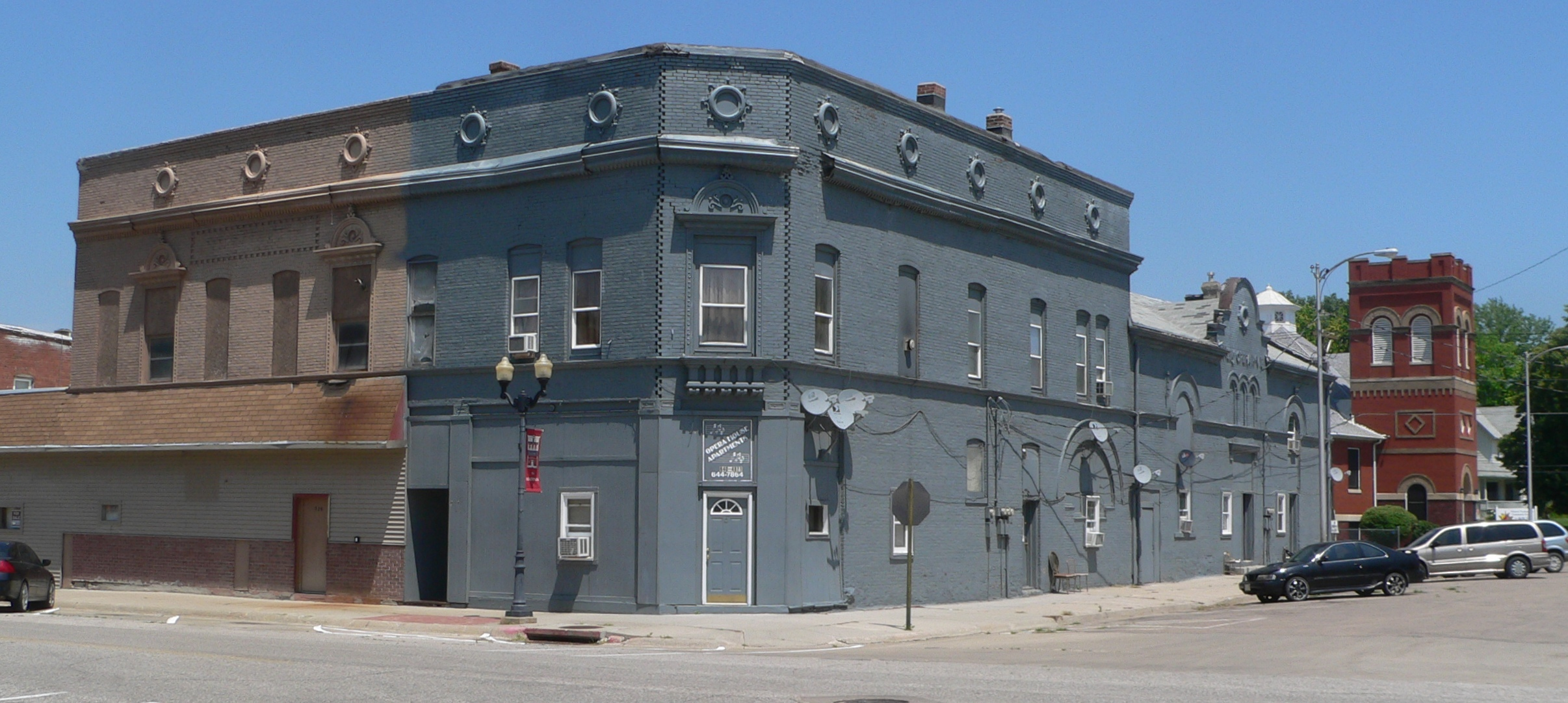
Hein's Opera House. The Presbyterian church is in the right background.

By 1910, Madison's population exceeded 1,700. In about 1912, it was decided that a new Presbyterian church should be built. The 1882 church was torn down and its material salvaged: some was incorporated into the new church, and some used to build houses in eastern Madison. The new church's cornerstone was laid on November 18, 1913; while it was under construction, services were held in the lodge hall on the second floor of Hein's Opera House. Built at a cost of $26,000, the new church was dedicated on June 14, 1914, with a capacity of 200 people in the sanctuary, which could be expanded to 350 by opening the adjoining Sunday-school rooms.

In the second half of the 20th century, the church's membership decreased significantly. The last regular pastor died in 1986, and was succeeded by a series of stated supplies. By 2007, the congregation had declined to nine members, four of them living in nursing homes; they concluded that they could no longer afford to maintain the church building, and held the final service in May 2007.

To preserve the building, a group of Madisonites incorporated as Preservation Madison, Inc. They obtained non-profit status and secured title to the church. To maintain it and to bring it into compliance with the Americans with Disabilities Act, they raised funds from private donations and from the city's Economic Development Fund. The group operates the church as the Historic Presbyterian Community Center, using it as a venue for weddings and funerals, and for community events such as concerts, plays, and art exhibits.

== Architecture ==
The Madison church was designed according to the Akron Plan, an architectural scheme that was used widely in Sunday-school buildings in the United States between the late 1860s and the mid-1910s.

=== Akron Plan ===
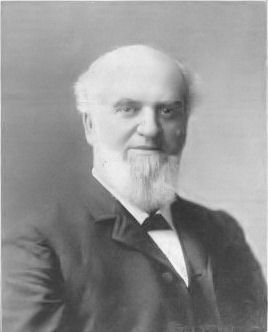
Lewis Miller

The Akron Plan was developed in response to changing Sunday-school practices. In the first part of the 19th century, the general tendency was for all pupils to learn the same lesson together in one large room. Beginning in about 1860, however, churches began implementing a new approach. All pupils learned the same lesson; but they were separated into grades, allowing each instructor to teach the lesson in a manner suitable for the age and level of development of their pupils. This practice was taken up by increasing numbers of churches; in 1872, a national convention adopted the Uniform Lesson Plan, implementing the practice nationwide.

The grades were not kept separate for the entire duration of the session. The class began with devotional exercises, led by the superintendent and involving the entire body of pupils. After this, the grades were taught separately. At the end of the session, the superintendent led, and the whole body participated in, a five-minute review of the lesson followed by closing exercises. This created a challenge for ecclesiastical architects: the Sunday-school building had to be designed in such a way that the pupils could quickly and efficiently be separated into various grades, and brought together for all-school activities.

One of those who addressed the design problem was Lewis Miller. A wealthy inventor and industrialist, Miller supervised a Sunday school in Canton, Ohio, and later one in Akron. When the First Methodist Episcopal Church in Akron decided to construct a new building, Miller worked with several architects to plan the Sunday-school wing. He devised a plan in which wedge-shaped classrooms were separated by partitions radiating from the direction of a central superintendent's platform. Doors on the platform-facing side of each classroom could be closed during grade-separated lessons, or opened to allow all pupils to see and hear the superintendent during school-wide exercises. The new church, following these plans, was constructed in 1866–67.

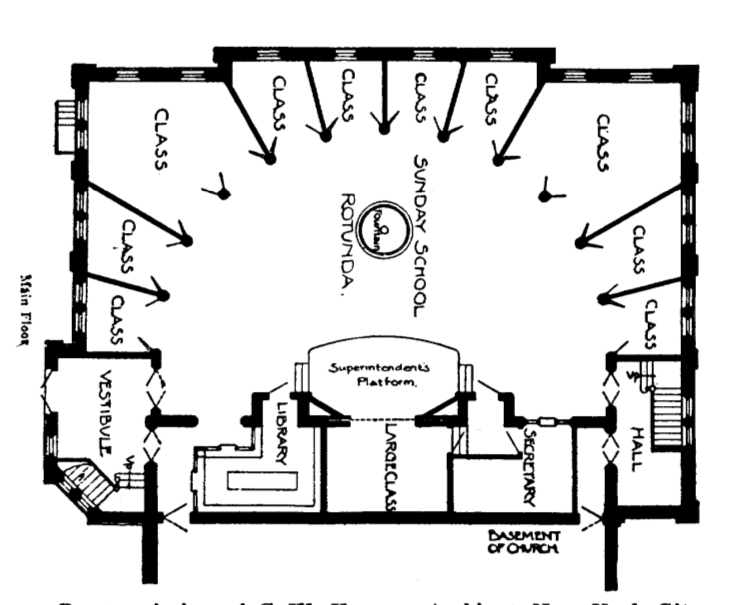
Original Akron Plan

The so-called Akron Plan was adopted by Protestant churches throughout the United States and the world. Many of these churches modified the design with the addition of a movable partition between the sanctuary and the Sunday-school spaces, allowing the Sunday-school classes and the main body of congregants to be separated or united.

The Akron Plan's popularity declined after 1908, when an international Sunday-school convention approved the development of completely graded lesson plans. Pupils were to be kept in separate classes for the entire session; the school-wide exercises led by the superintendent were eliminated. This did away with the chief advantage of the Akron Plan, whose awkwardly shaped, imperfectly soundproofed, and often poorly lighted rooms were not well suited for any other use. To create more useful spaces, many Akron Plan interiors were remodelled; by the beginning of the 21st century, few intact Akron Plan interiors remained.

=== Madison church ===
The Madison Presbyterian church is located on the southeast corner of Fourth and Nebraska Streets. Architecturally, its design has been described as "a modest Romanesque Revival style". As a representative of this style, and because its interior serves as a well-preserved example of Akron plan design, the church was listed in the National Register of Historic Places in 2008.

==== Exterior ====
The church is chiefly built out of red brick, with a belt course and a parapet of Bedford stone. Light tan brick is used for decorative patterns and embellishments.

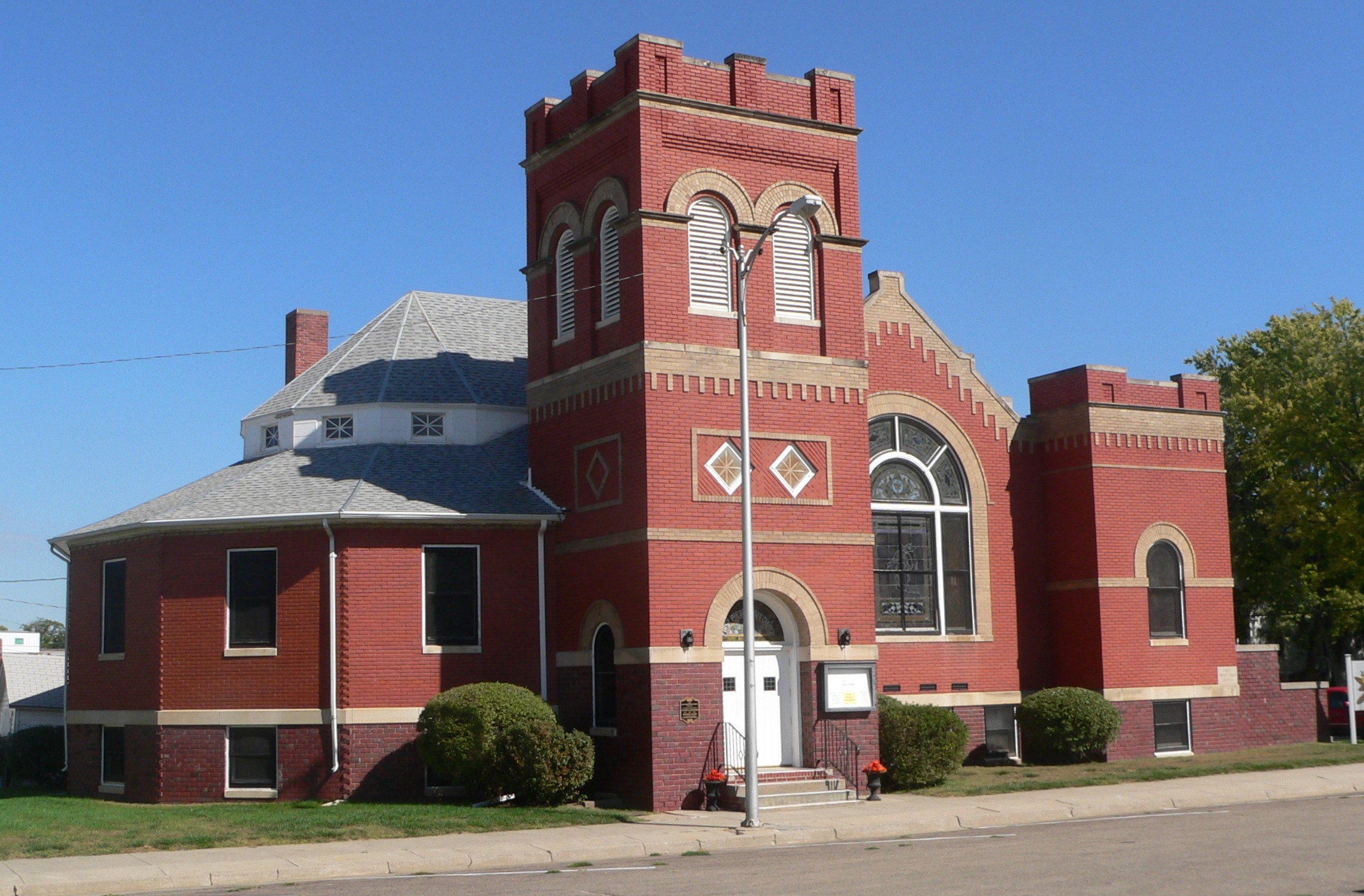
View from the southwest. The polygonal Sunday-school room is at left (west).

The plan of the building is generally rectangular. A six-sided (half a dodecagon) projection on the west side houses the Sunday-school room. Two low square towers stand at the northeast and southeast corners of the building; on the east side of each, a flight of concrete steps leads to an entrance, one to the pastor's study and one to the sanctuary. A somewhat taller square bell tower stands near the southwest corner; the arched main entrance to the building is on the south side of this tower.

A large round-headed window is located between the two towers on the south side, and another between the two towers on the east side. Smaller round-headed windows occur on the east and west sides of the bell tower, at about the same level as the south entrance. On the south side of the bell tower, above the doorway, is a pair of diamond-shaped windows set in a raised rectangle of light-tan brick; on the east and west sides, at the same level, are similar arrangements, but with diamond-shaped decorations of corbelled light-tan brick instead of windows. Above these are paired round-headed windows with wood louvered shutters.

An octagonal cupola with clerestory windows tops the main section of the building. The roof of the polygonal Sunday-school section slopes upward, then gives way to short vertical walls defining a kind of cupola, also with clerestory windows.

==== Interior ====
The principal entrance, on the south side of the belltower, leads to a small vestibule from which short flights of stairs rise to the sanctuary level and descend to the basement.

From the main entrance, one enters the sanctuary at the southwest corner. The room is rectangular, with a floor that slopes downward; an aisle follows this downward slope from the southwest entrance to the altar platform at the northeast corner. On either side of this aisle, curved oak pews run diagonally across the room from southeast to northwest. An Estey pipe organ stands on the north side of the altar platform; along the north wall is a small platform for the choir. A doorway at the northeast corner, behind the organ, leads to a small pastor's study.

Two large stained-glass windows are located on the south and east walls. In the center of the ceiling, beneath the cupola, is a stained-glass window, lit during the day by the cupola's clerestory windows. The base of the cupola is surrounded by a circle of electric lights.

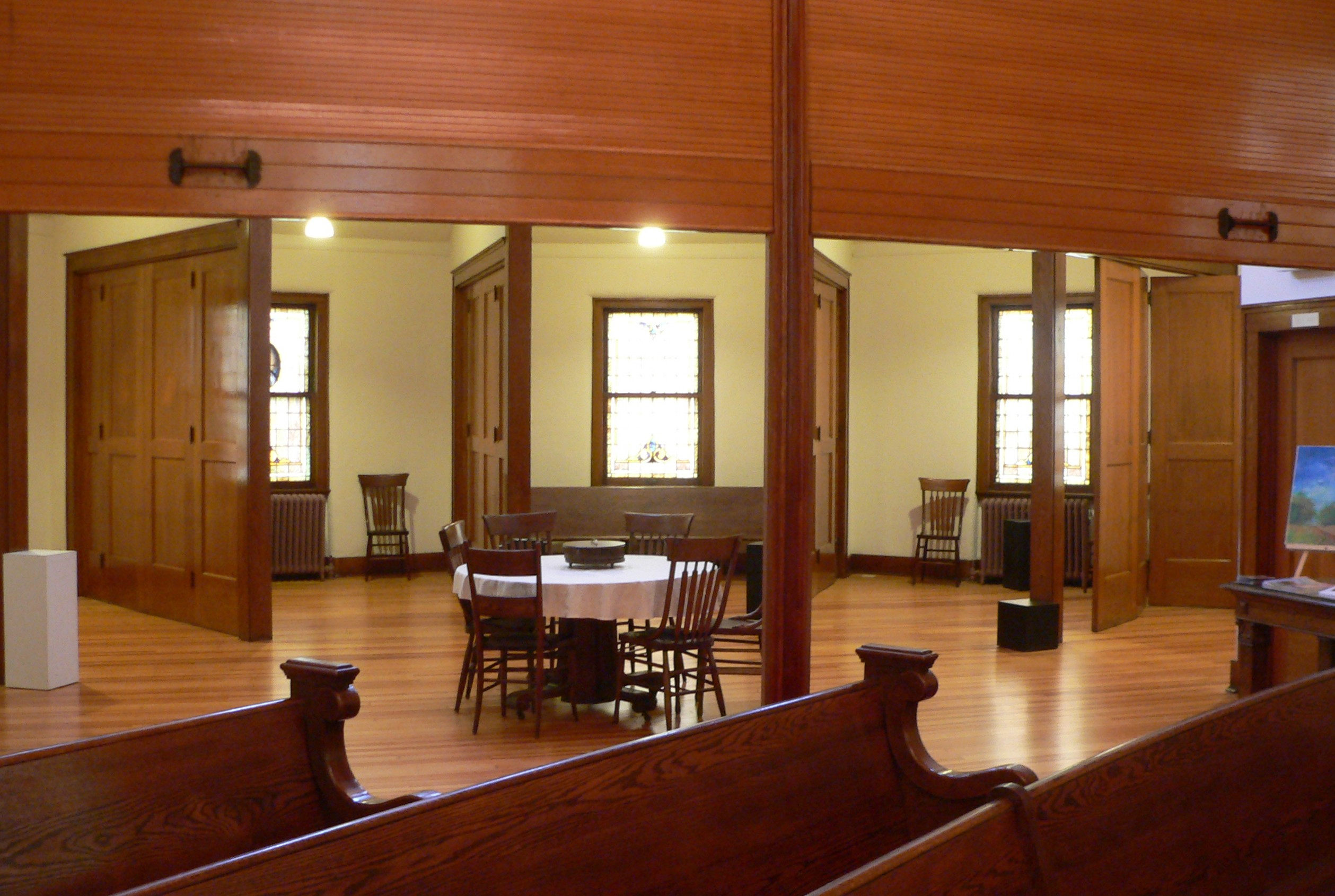
View from the sanctuary, through the half-closed tambour doors, into the Sunday-school rooms

Two tambour doors, each 14 feet high by 12 feet wide (4.3 m by 3.7 m), divide the sanctuary from the Sunday-school rooms. The doors can be closed to separate the two spaces, or opened to unite them. The Sunday-school space is divided into wedge-shaped rooms by four-section folding doors 9 feet (2.7 m) high; these can be closed to divide the space into six classrooms, or opened to make a single open space of it.

The basement contains a second Sunday-school space, laid out in the same fashion as the rooms on the upper floor. Beneath the sanctuary is a fellowship room; north of that is a kitchen. The basement also contains two restrooms, a ladies' lounge, and a closet containing the pump for the organ. A stairwell at the north end of the basement leads up to an exterior door on the north side of the building, and down to the onetime furnace room.
