= The Gothic Building =

- U.S. National Register of Historic Places
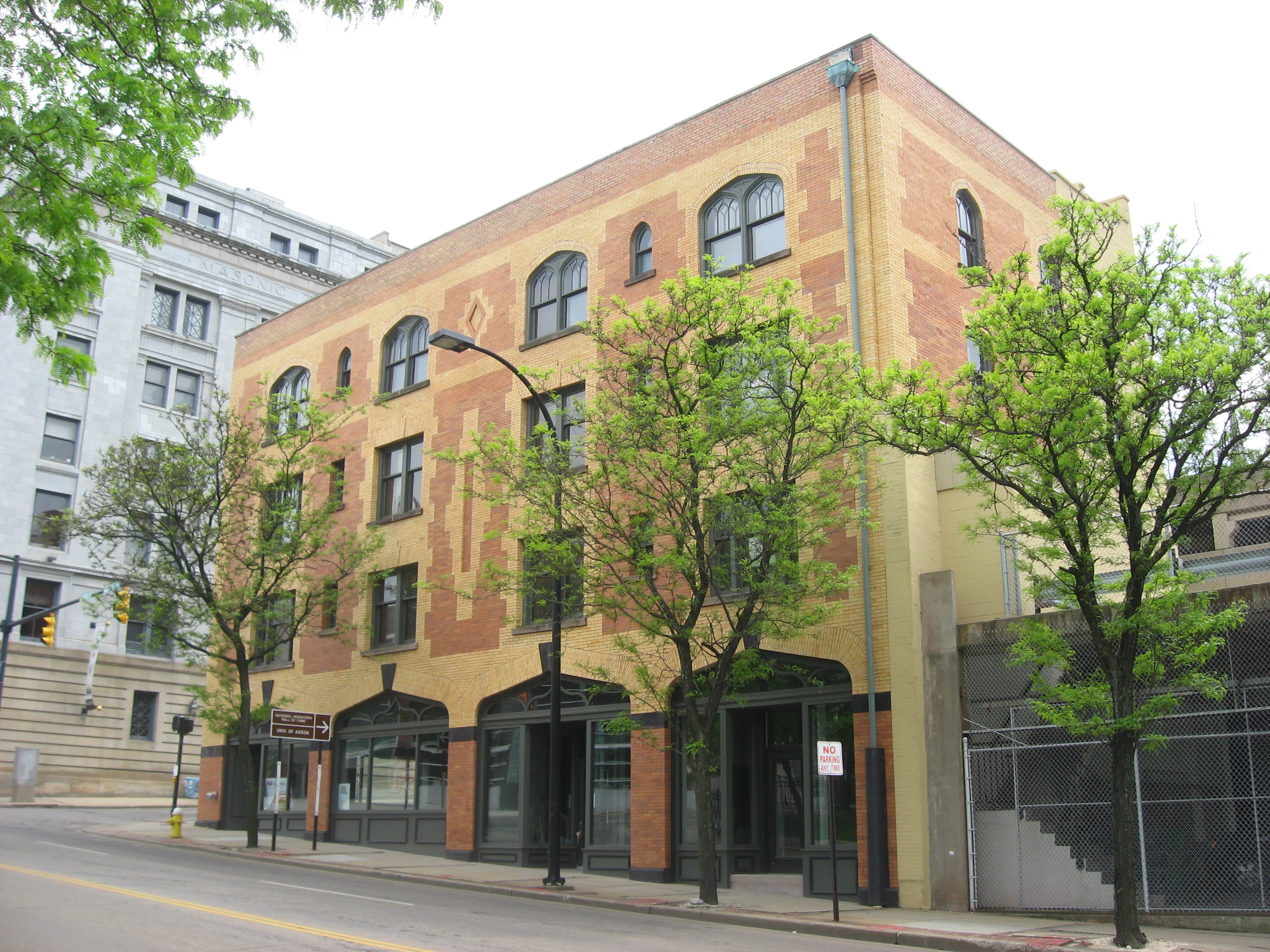
- The Gothic Building
- Location: 102 S. High St. & 52-58 E. Mill St., Akron, Ohio
- Coordinates: 41°05′01″N 81°30′57″W
- Area: 0.1 acres (0.040 ha)
- Built: 1902
- Architect: Frank O. Weary; Crisp & Son
- Architectural style: Italianate, Tudor Revival
- NRHP reference No.: 10000280
- Added to NRHP: May 21, 2010

The Gothic Building is a historic building in Akron, Ohio. It was designed by prominent Akron architect Frank O. Weary and built in 1902. Weary also designed a Carnegie Library (Akron Public Library), county courthouses, and school buildings in Akron and other areas of Ohio, as well as significant buildings in other states. The Colonial Theatre was attached to the Gothic Building. The Gothic Building is listed on the National Register of Historic Places.

Tax credits for the redevelopment of historic buildings have been used to redevelop it and other historic buildings in downtown Akron by Tony Troppe.

Architectural drawing from the Historic American Buildings Survey for The Gothic Building

The Gothic Building was documented for the Historic American Buildings Survey. It is described as Tudor Revival architecture.

== See also ==
- National Register of Historic Places listings in Akron, Ohio
