= First United Methodist Church (Mount Vernon, New York) =

Historic church in New York, United States

- U.S. National Register of Historic Places

- Location within New York Location within the United States
- Location: 227 E. Lincoln Ave., Mount Vernon, New York
- Coordinates: 40°55′6″N 73°49′45″W
- Area: less than one acre
- Built: 1900
- Architect: Kramer, George W.
- Architectural style: Romanesque
- NRHP reference No.: 99001656
- Added to NRHP: January 7, 2000

First United Methodist Church, also known as Chester Hill ME Church, is a historic United Methodist church at 227 E. Lincoln Avenue in Mount Vernon, Westchester County, New York, United States. It was built in 1900-1901 and is a Romanesque Revival style building. It is constructed of granite with limestone details and a red slate roof. It features an 85-foot bell and clock tower and multi-gabled roof. The interior features a semi-circular, amphitheater-like seating plan in the Akron Plan.

It was a work of architect George W. Kramer.

It was added to the National Register of Historic Places in 2000.

== See also ==
- National Register of Historic Places listings in southern Westchester County, New York
