= Drayton United Methodist Church =

Historic church in North Dakota, United States

- U.S. National Register of Historic Places
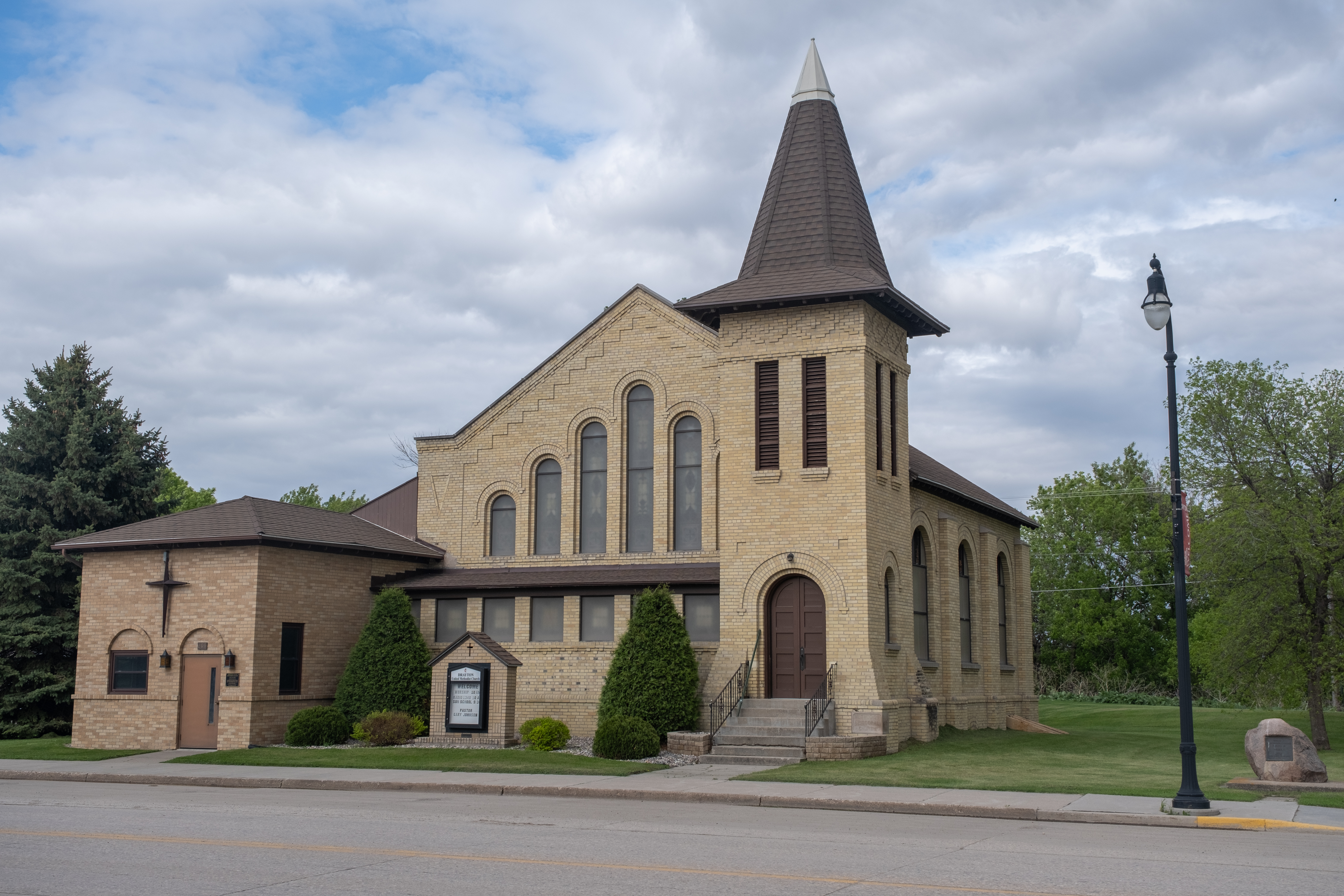

- Location within North Dakota Location within the United States
- Location: ND 44, Drayton, North Dakota
- Coordinates: 48°33′48″N 97°10′37″W
- Area: less than one acre
- Built: 1905–06
- Architect: A.W. McCrea, Jr.
- Architectural style: Romanesque, Late Romanesque Revival, Other
- NRHP reference No.: 79001773
- Added to NRHP: December 10, 1979

The Drayton United Methodist Church in Drayton, North Dakota, United States was built from 1905 to 1906 in a Romanesque Revival style. It was listed on the National Register of Historic Places in 1979.

It was the work of New York City architect A. W. McCrea Jr., who was from Drayton. Its exterior is Drayton brick, and the design conforms to what is known as the Akron Plan, of the Protestant revivalist movement. The church was founded by Scots-Irish Methodist immigrants from Eastern Canada.
