= Underwood Computing Machine Company Factory =

- U.S. National Register of Historic Places
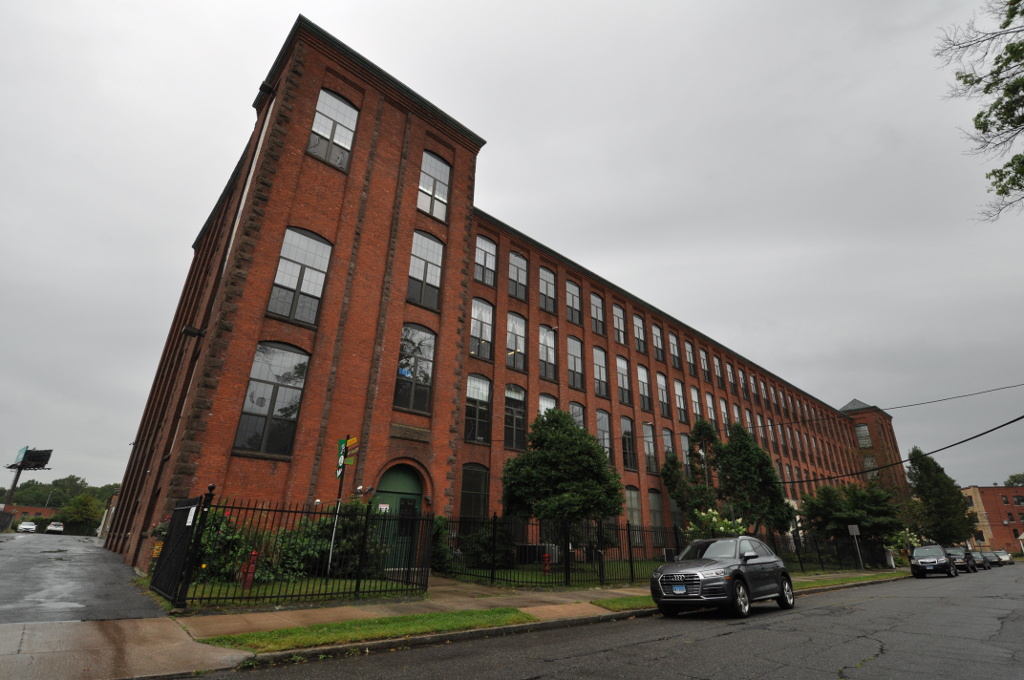

- Location within Connecticut Location within the United States
- Location: 56 Arbor Street, Hartford, Connecticut
- Coordinates: 41°45′34″N 72°42′13″W
- Area: 2.9 acres (1.2 ha)
- Built: 1917
- Architect: Oldershaw, Frank H.
- NRHP reference No.: 10000895
- Added to NRHP: November 12, 2010

The Underwood Computing Machine Company Factory is a historic industrial complex at 56 Arbor Street in the Parkville neighborhood of Hartford, Connecticut. Developed beginning in 1917 by the Underwood Typewriter Company, it was used by that company and its successors for manufacturing, research, and development until 1969. It presently houses the artistic collaborative Real Art Ways and other organizations. The complex was listed on the National Register of Historic Places in 1989.

== Description and history ==
The former Underwood Computing Machine Company plant is located Southwest of Downtown Hartford in the Parkville Neighborhood, on 2.9 acres (1.2 ha) bounded by Arbor Street, Orange Street, and the CTfastrak busway. The main building is a four-story brick structure, 325 feet (99 m) in length, with projecting stair towers at the north end, and at the corner of Arbor and Orange. The towers have brownstone corner quoining, and windows set in recessed panels. The main walls consists mainly of rows of windows set in segmented-arch openings separated by brick piers. The principal building entrances are recessed in the bases of the towers, one of which has Art Deco stylistic elements.

The Underwood Computing Machine Company was founded in New York City in 1909 by John T. Underwood, then president of the Underwood Typewriter Company. The company manufactured calculators and accounting and billing machines for commercial use. Its early production facilities were located in Hartford's Chamber of Commerce building on Hawthorne Street. In 1916 that building was acquired by another tenant, and the Underwood Computing Machine Company sought new quarters. This facility was built beginning in 1917 to serve its needs, under a lease agreement that ended with the company buying it in 1927. The company itself was acquired by Elliot-Fisher in 1928, which moved production to a larger facility on Capitol Avenue. This plant was converted into a training, research and development facility in 1936. The company was purchased by Olivetti in 1959, and this facility was closed by Olivetti in 1969. It has since been rehabilitated and repurposed, housing the Real Art Ways collaborative among other organizations.

== See also ==
- National Register of Historic Places listings in Hartford, Connecticut
