= Bay Ridge United Methodist Church =

Church in Brooklyn, New York

- U.S. National Register of Historic Places
- New York State Register of Historic Places
- Location within New York City Location within New York Location within the United States
- Location: 7002 Fourth Ave., Brooklyn, New York
- Coordinates: 40°38′1″N 74°1′28″W
- Area: less than one acre
- Built: 1899
- Architect: Kramer, George W.
- Architectural style: Romanesque Revival
- NRHP reference No.: 99001132
- NYSRHP No.: 04701.014921

Significant dates
- Added to NRHP: September 9, 1999
- Designated NYSRHP: July 23, 1999

Bay Ridge United Methodist Church, originally known as Grace Methodist Episcopal Church, was a historic Methodist church at 7002 Fourth Avenue and Ovington Avenue in Bay Ridge, Brooklyn, New York City. It was designed by architect George W. Kramer. It was built in 1899 in the Romanesque Revival style. It was built of green serpentine stone and trimmed in brown stone. It featured a four-stage, crenelated clock tower. Also on the property was the contributing Sunday School building built in 1926–1927.

It was listed on the National Register of Historic Places in 1999. The church was demolished October 21, 2008.
