= Second Presbyterian Church (Portsmouth, Ohio) =

Historic church in Ohio, United States

- U.S. National Register of Historic Places
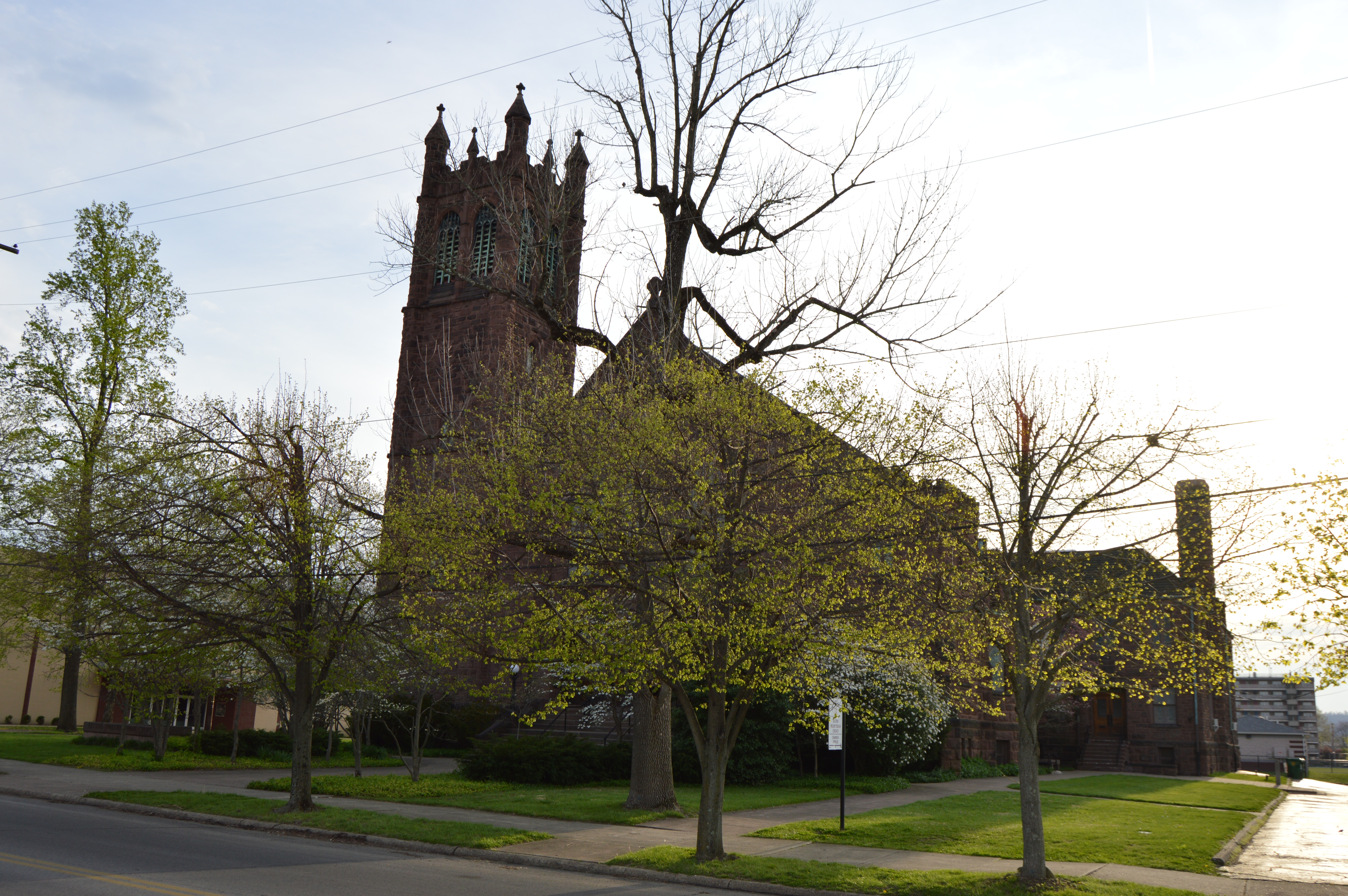
- Front and northern side

- Location within Ohio Location within the United States
- Location: 801 Waller St., Portsmouth, Ohio
- Coordinates: 38°44′11″N 82°59′23″W
- Area: less than one acre
- Built: 1911
- Built by: J.C. Fulton & Sons. et al
- Architect: Kramer, George W.
- Architectural style: Late Gothic Revival
- NRHP reference No.: 96000926
- Added to NRHP: August 22, 1996

The Second Presbyterian Church in Portsmouth, Ohio is a historic church at 801 Waller Street.

It was built in 1911 and was a work of architect George W. Kramer.

It was added to the National Register of Historic Places in 1996. As of 2012 the congregation is affiliated with the Presbyterian Church (U.S.A.).
