= Carroll County Courthouse (Ohio) =

Local government building in the United States

- U.S. National Register of Historic Places
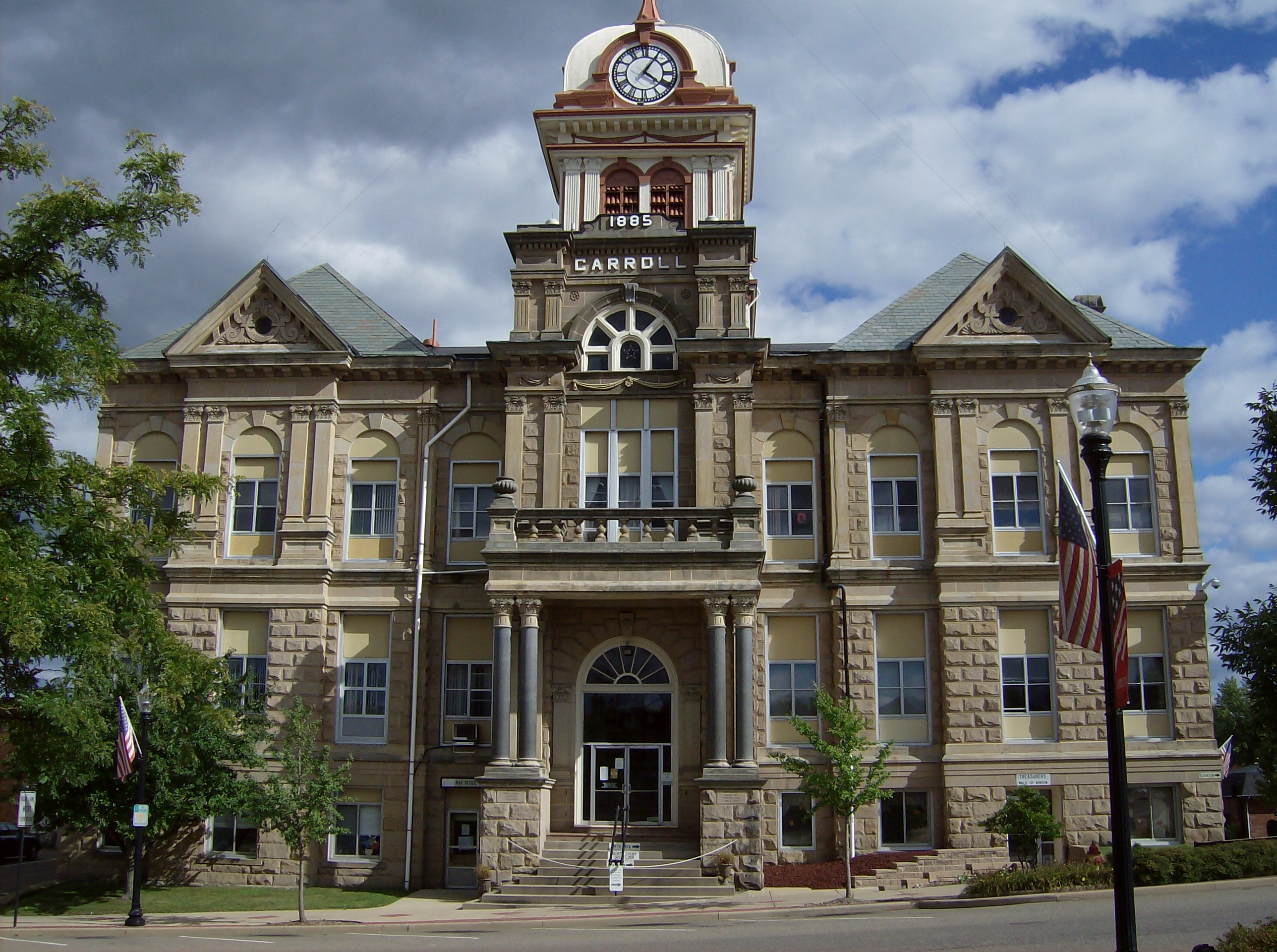
- Façade of the courthouse

- Location within Ohio Location within the United States
- Interactive map showing the location for Carroll County Courthouse
- Location: Public Sq., Carrollton, Ohio
- Coordinates: 40°34′20″N 81°5′9″W
- Area: 2 acres (0.81 ha)
- Built: 1884
- Architect: Frank O. Weary; J.S. Melbourne
- Architectural style: Second Empire
- NRHP reference No.: 74001406
- Added to NRHP: October 22, 1974

The Carroll County Courthouse is located in Carrollton, Ohio, and is the second for the county. It was designed by architect Frank Weary in the Second Empire style. The courthouse was listed on the National Register of Historic Places in 1974.

== History ==
Carroll County was established in 1833 and carved from Columbiana, Harrison, Jefferson, Stark and Tuscarawas counties. The first courthouse was built in Carrollton in 1834 and was a simple two-story brick building with a cupola topping off the structure. The first courthouse was designed by Peter Herold and James McMullin was contracted as the builder. When McMullin failed to meet expectations and the contract was awarded to John Lacey who also failed to honor his contract. The county wished to finish the construction and in desperation placed the contract with John Rankin. Unfortunately for the county, Rankin too failed to meet the obligations of the contract and George Hampson was selected instead. Hampson remained at this post and saw the courthouse into completion in 1837.

The courthouse was determined to be too small and a new courthouse was selected from the architect Frank Weary. The design submitted was in the Second Empire style popular for courthouses.

== Exterior ==
Constructed in 1884–1885, it consists of rough sandstone blocks. The main entrance is reached by stairs and a small portico, with Corinthian columns supporting the balcony above. The first and second floors once were large rectangular panel windows, but have shrunk to conserve power and energy. The third floor windows were once large arched windows but they too have been shrunk.

A projecting cornice rises over the roof above the entrance with the name "Carroll" inscribed in white and the year "1885" above it. a large fanlight rests below the nameplate and allows more light to infiltrate the building. On the other sides a gable rises with bracing from projecting Tudor style chimneys. A mansard roof rises to a central tower supporting a dome and four cardinal point clock faces. A small spire rises from the top. A statue of Justice once adorned this point but was taken down during renovations.

Writing shortly after the courthouse was completed, Henry Howe noted : "...costing with jail in the rear about $150,000. It is built mainly from Navarre sandstone, with some from Berea. It is just to the left of the old courthouse shown in the old view. The old courthouse was sold on the 11th of June for $196 and the bell for $138."

A two-story rear wing was added in 1976 to provide more room for the county jail and an annex for the county officials.

== Interior ==
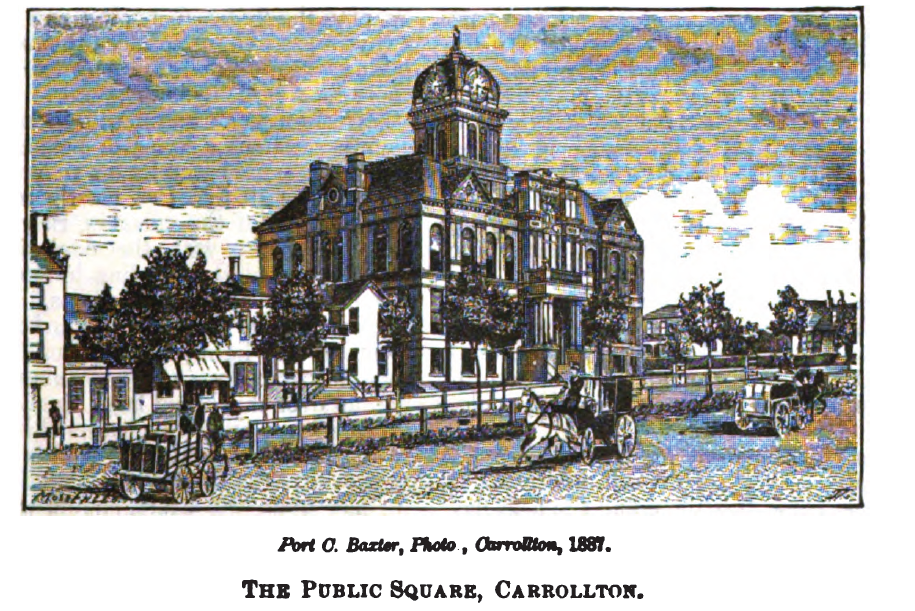
1887 sketch by Henry Howe

The interior hosts smooth mosaic the building features tiled floors, recently lowered ceilings, and ornate steel staircases. Its interior comprises four levels, including one underground. A renovation modernized many aspects of the courthouse, including its wiring, heating and cooling systems, as well as several decorative elements.

The courthouse is connected to a county jail and a court annex located at the rear of the complex. The annex, constructed in 1976, is a plain red brick structure with minimal ornamentation and large rectangular windows. A solid balustrade runs along the top, concealing the flat roof.
