= Andrews United Methodist Church =

Church in Brooklyn, New York

- U.S. National Register of Historic Places
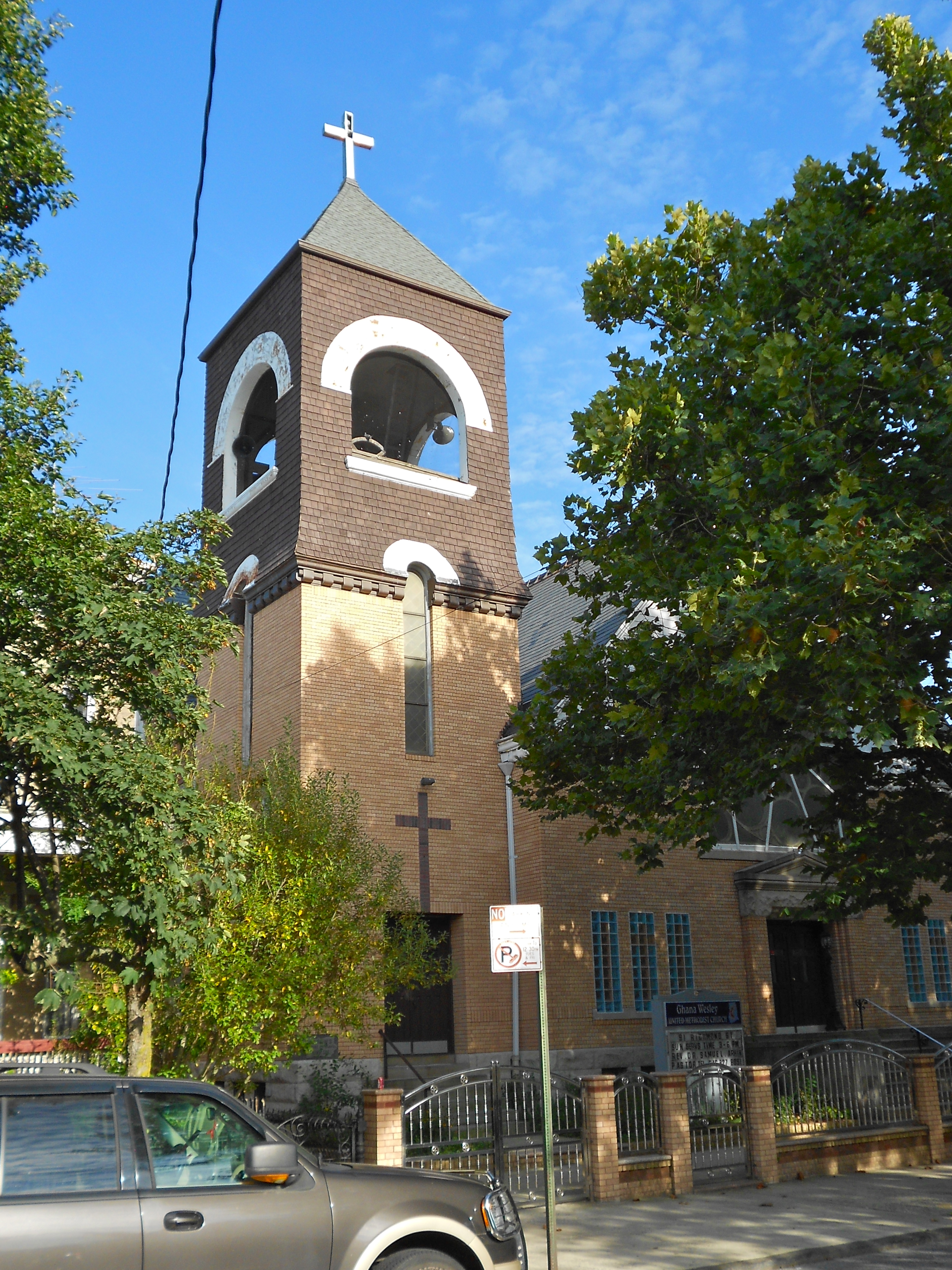

- Location within New York City Location within New York Location within the United States
- Location: 95 Richmond St., Brooklyn, New York
- Coordinates: 40°41′7″N 73°52′38″W
- Area: less than one acre
- Built: 1893
- Architect: Kramer & Weary; George W. Kramer
- Architectural style: Queen Anne, Romanesque
- NRHP reference No.: 91001977
- Added to NRHP: January 22, 1992

Andrews United Methodist Church is a historic Methodist church at 95 Richmond Street in Cypress Hills, Brooklyn, New York, United States. It is now Andrews Ghana Wesley United Methodist Church. It was built in 1893 and is a one-story, asymmetrical orange brick church in the Queen Anne style. It features a massive rose window on the front facade and a three-story, square bell tower. The interior is arranged on the Akron Plan. Attached to the church is a two-story Sunday school wing. Also on the property is the original church parsonage It is a two-story frame dwelling built in 1878–1879 in the Italianate style.

It was listed on the National Register of Historic Places in 1992.

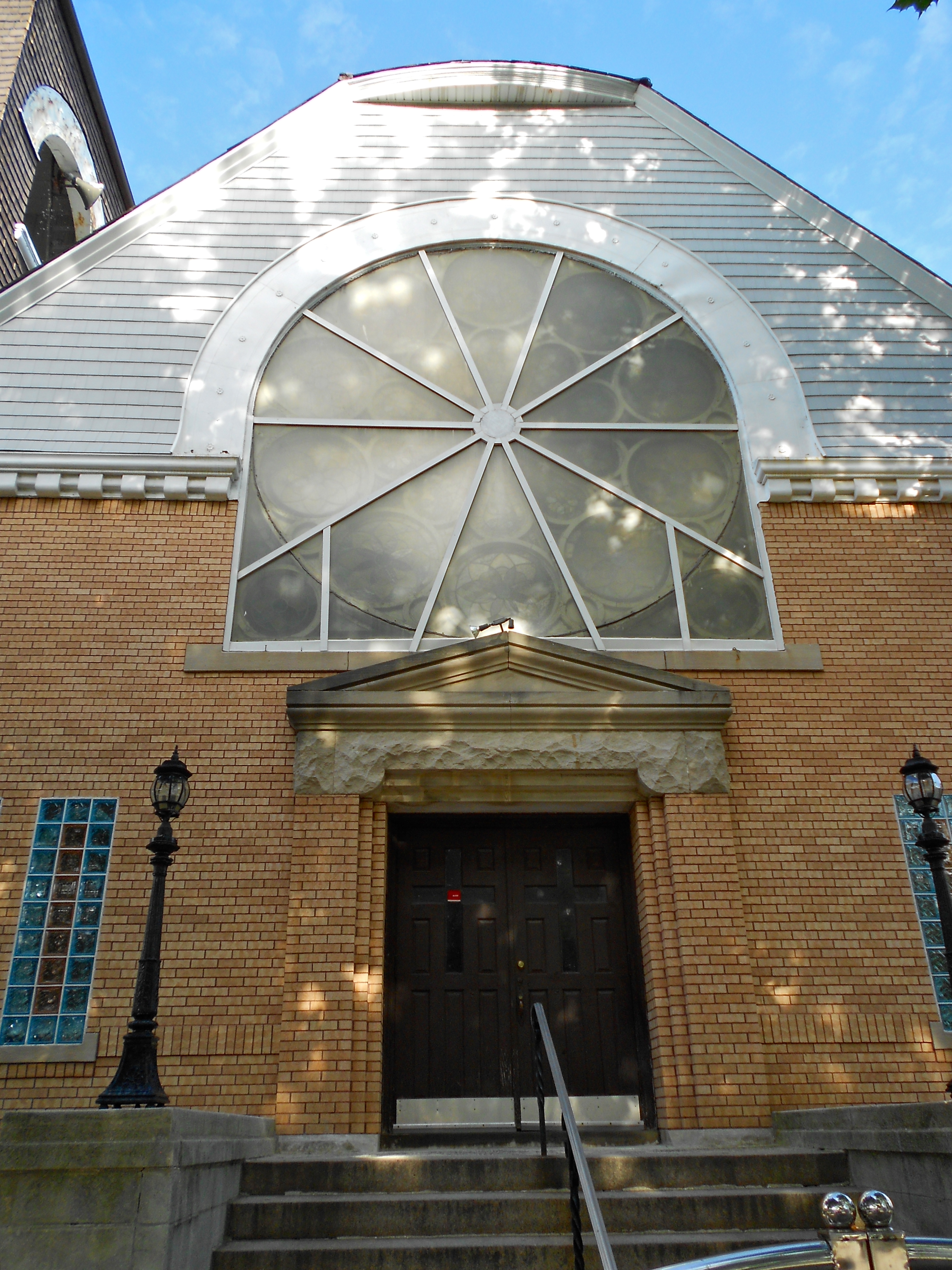
Main entrance

== See also ==
- National Register of Historic Places listings in Brooklyn
