= Akron-Summit County Public Library =

Library in Ohio, US

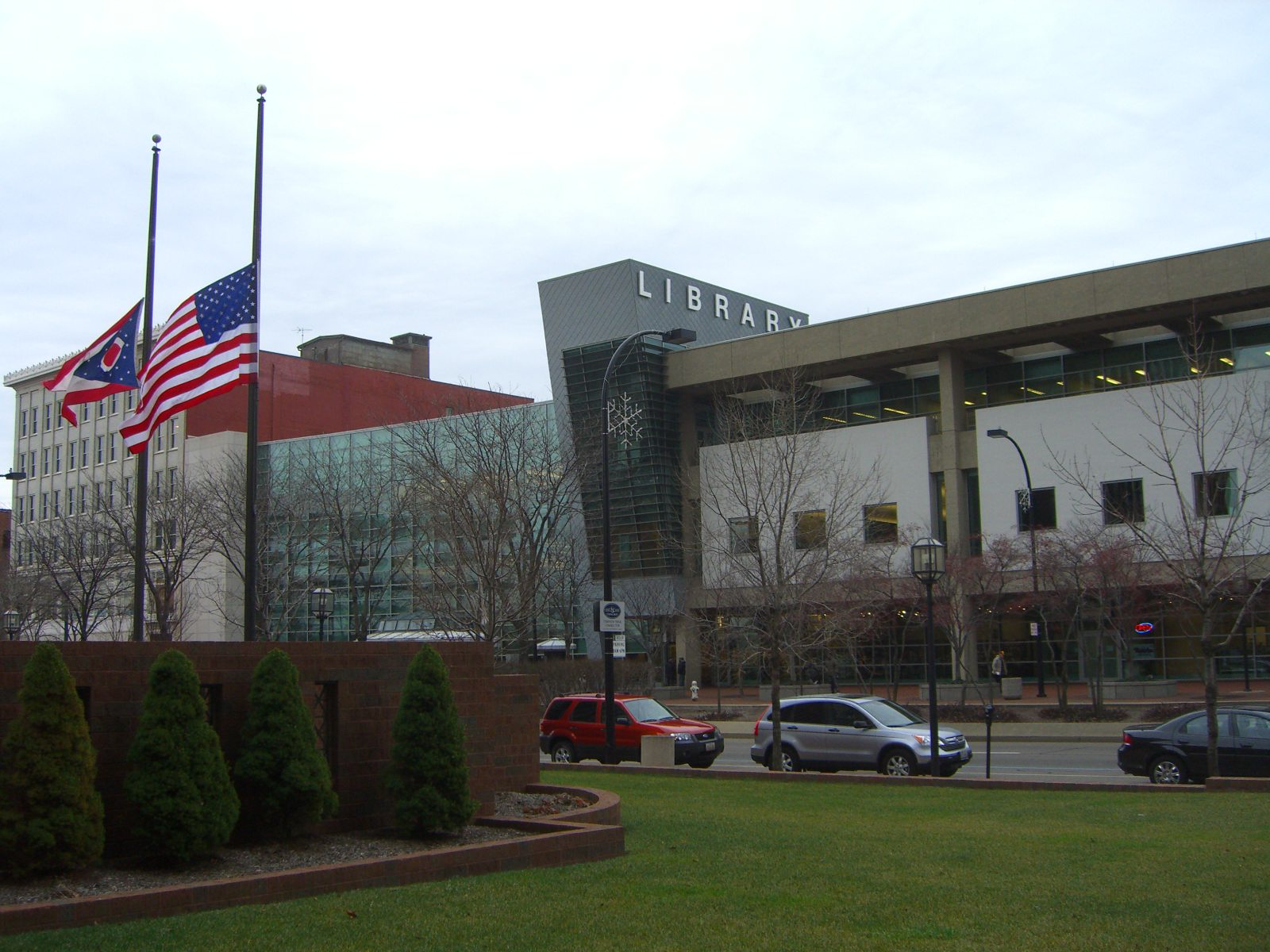
- Main Library located in downtown Akron, Ohio South Main Street entrance to the Akron-Summit County Public Library Main Library
- 41°04′58″N 81°30′59″W
- Location: 60 South High Street, Akron, Ohio, 44326, United States
- Type: Public library
- Established: March 1, 1874; 152 years ago
- Branches: Main Library and 18 branch libraries

Collection
- Size: 2,500,000 (2025)
- Legal deposit: Selective federal depository library

Access and use
- Circulation: 4,590,000 (2025)
- Population served: 381,648 (2025)

Other information
- Budget: $41,313,031 (2025)
- Director: Michelle Alleman (acting executive director since 2025)
- Employees: 400
- Website: www.akronlibrary.org

The Akron-Summit County Public Library is a public library system in Akron, Ohio. Founded in 1874, it operates the Main Library on South High Street and South Main Street in downtown Akron, 18 branch libraries located throughout the city of Akron and Summit County, the Akron Art Library (located on the Second Floor of Main Library, and at the Ellet Branch, the North Hill Branch, and the Odom Boulevard Branch), the Project LEARN of Summit County Training Room (located on the First Floor of Main Library), Mobile Services (located on the Lower Floor of Main Library), and Project LEARN of Summit County (also located on the Lower Floor of Main Library). As of 2013, they have a lion cub mascot, named Paws.

== History ==
An early predecessor of Akron Public Library (now known as Akron-Summit County Public Library) was the subscription library, the Akron Lyceum and Library Association Company formed in 1834 "for the promotion of literary pursuits." The Akron Library Association was formed in 1866 with a reading room in the Masonic Temple at South Howard Street and East Mill Street. Another predecessor of the Akron Public Library was the subscription library, the Akron Mechanic's Library, founded in 1870. In 1874 the Akron Library Association became the Akron Public Library.

On January 26, 1874, the Akron City Council established an ordinance to provide a free public library for Akron. On February 27, 1874, the Board of Trustees of the newly formed library met for the first time, with John R. Buchtel serving as the first board president. On March 1, 1874, the library officially opened to the public on the second floor of the Masonic Temple that was located on the corner of South Howard Street and East Mill Street. In October 1898, the recently established public library moved from the Masonic Temple to the second floor of the Everett Building on East Market Street and North Main Street.

The library grew rapidly and in August 1904, it moved to a new building funded by steel baron Andrew Carnegie who, in his retirement, provided funding for the building of 1,679 public Carnegie libraries in the United States. The building, at the corner of East Market Street and South High Street, is now office space. The library occupied this building until 1942 when its growing collection necessitated a move to larger quarters in the former Akron Beacon Journal building located at the corner of East Market Street and Summit Street.

As early as 1958, Library officials began discussions regarding the need for a new Main Library. Library Director Russell Munn felt strongly that this new building should be located on South Main Street. In 1962, a bond issue was legislated that would provide $3 million for the construction of the new library. Ground was broken on September 15, 1965, and the doors to the 148,300 square feet (13,777.52 m^{2}) Main Library on South Main Street and South High Street opened on March 24, 1969, and the dedication ceremony was held on April 27, 1969. On May 30, 1974, the name of the library was changed from the Akron Public Library to the Akron-Summit County Public Library when the library officially changed its organization from a school district and extension center library to a county district library.

Changing technology and expanding services to a growing population necessitated an expanded Main Library. In 1996, library officials began to plan for a new building. Discussions took place about relocating the library, but the final decision was to remain at its present location and expand. Due to the nature of the expansion, all materials and staff were relocated to a temporary location. In May 2001, Main Library closed its doors and began the move to a former DIY store on East Tallmadge Avenue. For more than three years Main Library operated from this facility until October 10, 2004, when the newly renovated and expanded 300,000 square feet (27,870.91 m^{2}) Main Library on South High Street and South Main Street reopened its doors to the community and was rededicated.

== Main Library ==
Main Library is located at 60 South High Street, Akron, Ohio, 44326. It has seven Special Divisions: Business, Government & Science (includes History and magazines and newspapers); a 12,000 square feet (1,114.84 m^{2}) Children's Library; Culture & AV (includes Humanities; fine arts and music; and fiction); Mobile Services; Special Collections (includes Akron History, Summit County History, Ohio History & Genealogy, along with the microfilm machines); TechZone@Main (a makerspace); and Teen. The Main Library is a selective federal depository library.

Main Library has a 425-seat auditorium (located on the High Street level), a used bookstore, and a café. An interior walkway leads to a 600-space parking garage owned by the City of Akron. Main Library also has an outdoor amphitheater and landscaped park outside of the library's rear South Main Street entrance.

== Materials and Services ==
When the Library was officially established in 1874, a large collection of German language books was established for the many German-speaking residents of the time. In 1929, a Readers' Advisory service was established for the purpose of providing reference and programming service to groups and educational institutions. Books, recordings, research databases, programs for children and adults, classes, meeting rooms (located on the High Street level), foreign language collections, the Library Express Delivery Service (LEDS), Patent and Trademark Resource Center, business resources, and grantsmanship materials.

Accessibility services available at Main Library include the Accessibility Zone with NLS talking book program and Braille books (both of which can be checked out), Large Print Keyboards and Magnisight CCTV, sensory inclusive items (sensory bags, weighted laptops and Quiet Zones). Social Stories (available through the KultureCity app at the Main Library and all 18 branch libraries), dementia inclusive resources, Same Day Select Service, Homebound Assistance (with the Library Express Home Delivery Service or LEDS), Vision Assistance (with large print books and audiobooks) and Hearing Assistance (with sign language interpreters).

== Akron Art Library ==
The Akron Art Library is located on the Second Floor of Main Library at 60 South High Street, Akron, Ohio, 44326, and also at the Ellet Branch, the North Hill Branch, and the Odom Boulevard Branch. The Akron Art Library is a project of the Akron Art Museum in partnership with the Akron-Summit County Public Library.

== Summit Memory ==
Summit Memory is a Summit County, Ohio local history collection, administered by the Special Collections Division of Akron-Summit County Public Library.

== Branch Libraries ==
The Akron-Summit County Public Library has 18 branch libraries located throughout the city of Akron and Summit County:

1. Ellet Branch Library: 2470 East Market Street, Akron, Ohio, 44312
2. Fairlawn–Bath Branch Library: 3101 Smith Road, Akron, Ohio, 44333
3. Firestone Park Branch Library: 1486 Aster Avenue, Akron, Ohio, 44301
4. Goodyear Branch Library: 60 Goodyear Boulevard, Akron, Ohio, 44305
5. Green Branch Library: 4046 Massillon Road, Uniontown, Ohio, 44685
6. Highland Square Branch Library: 807 West Market Street, Akron, Ohio, 44303
7. Kenmore Branch Library: 969 Kenmore Boulevard, Akron, Ohio, 44314
8. Maple Valley Branch Library: 1187 Copley Road, Akron, Ohio, 44320
9. Mogadore Branch Library: 144 South Cleveland Avenue, Mogadore, Ohio, 44260
10. Nordonia Hills Branch Library: 9458 Olde Eight Road, Northfield, Ohio, 44067
11. North Hill Branch Library: 183 East Cuyahoga Falls Avenue, Akron, Ohio, 44310
12. Northwest Akron Branch Library: 1720 Shatto Avenue, Akron, Ohio, 44313
13. Norton Branch Library: 3930 South Cleveland-Massillon Road, Norton, Ohio, 44203
14. Odom Boulevard Branch Library: 600 Vernon Odom Boulevard, Akron, Ohio, 44307
15. Portage Lakes Branch Library: 4261 Manchester Road, Akron, Ohio, 44319
16. Richfield Branch Library: 3761 South Grant Street, Richfield, Ohio, 44286
17. Springfield–Lakemore Branch Library: 1500 Canton Road Suite 360, Akron, Ohio, 44312
18. Tallmadge Branch Library: 90 Community Road, Tallmadge, Ohio, 44278

East Branch Library (now known as the Goodyear Branch Library), the first branch library to have its own building, was constructed in 1939. Prior to that, branch libraries were in locations as diverse as the Firestone Tire and Rubber Company's recreational hall, a department store, a church, and a local school. Sixteen of the branch libraries were replaced and one branch (Goodyear) underwent extensive renovations between 1999 and 2008 to accommodate the growing needs of current residents throughout Akron and Summit County. In 2018, the eighteenth and newest branch, the Springfield-Lakemore Branch, opened in Lakemore Plaza.

=== Mobile Services ===
The library's outreach services began in 1946, with bookmobile service to rural communities. Today, Mobile Services continues to extend library services beyond library buildings to children and adults in a number of different settings. Two bookmobiles visit schools, daycare centers, Head Start programs, and neighborhoods during the school year and in the summer. A van serves many senior citizens’ housing facilities and apartments using carts of materials brought inside to residents. Nursing homes and other residential facilities receive monthly deliveries of library materials. Mobile Services supports the men and women's libraries at the Summit County Jail and provides regular service to other correctional facilities for both adults and children. The Library Express Delivery Service (LEDS) provides library materials to the homebound via U.S. Postal Service. Postage is paid both ways by the Library.

== Service Area ==
The Akron-Summit County Public Library is considered to be a county library system with branch libraries located throughout the City of Akron, and in cities, towns and villages throughout Summit County, but it does not have branch libraries in Barberton, Cuyahoga Falls, Hudson, Peninsula, Stow-Munroe Falls, or Twinsburg which are serviced by their own smaller independent libraries.
