= Crossroads United Methodist Church =

Historic church in Ohio, United States

- First Methodist Episcopal Church
- U.S. National Register of Historic Places
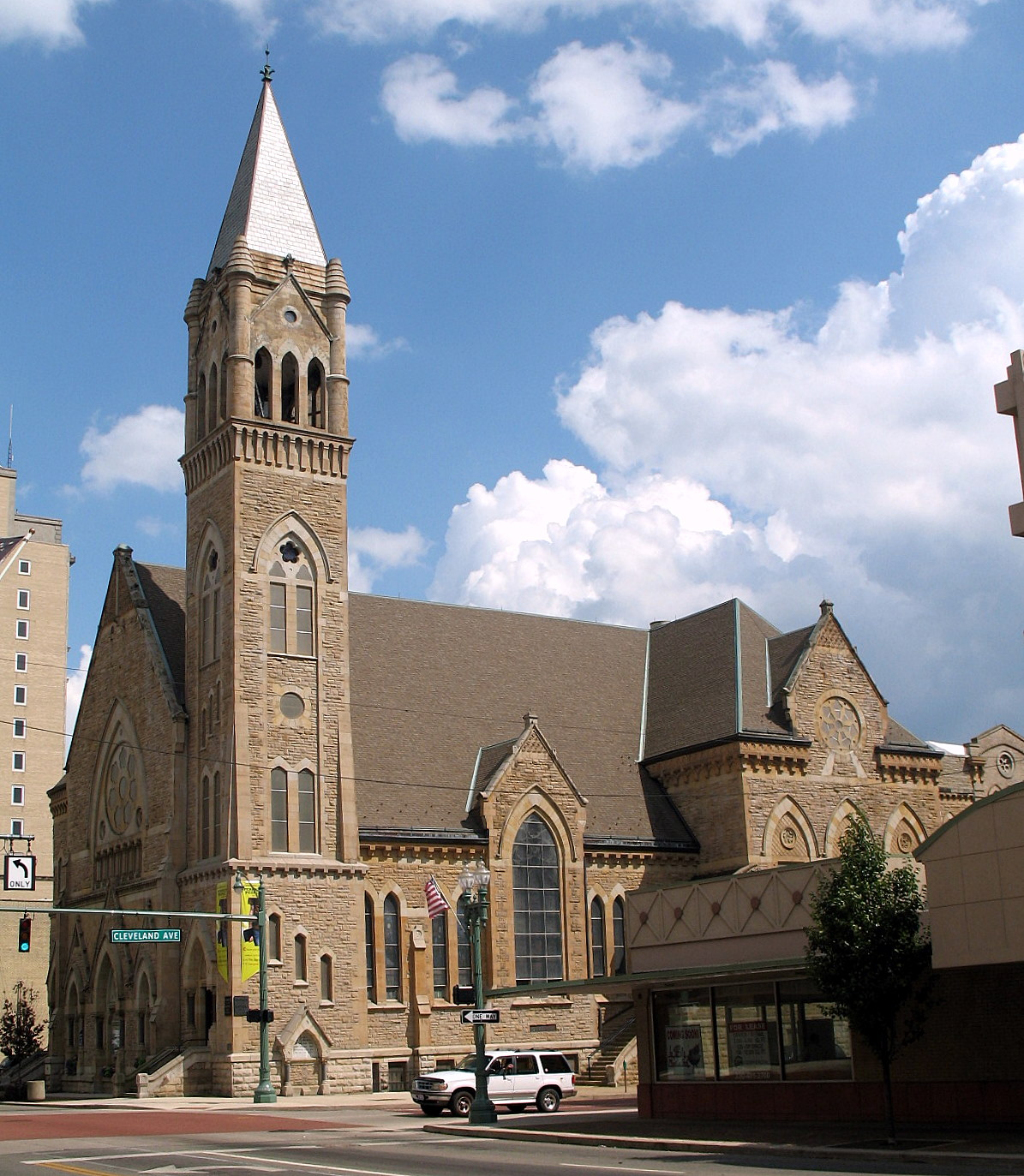
- Front and side of the church

- Location within Ohio Location within the United States
- Location: 120 Cleveland Ave., SW, Canton, Ohio
- Coordinates: 40°47′54″N 81°22′35″W
- Area: less than one acre
- Built: 1881
- Architect: Frank O. Weary
- Architectural style: High Victorian Gothic
- NRHP reference No.: 79001948
- Added to NRHP: April 16, 1979

Crossroads United Methodist Church is a historic Methodist church in Canton, Ohio. Originally the First Methodist Episcopal Church, it was renamed Church of the Savior United Methodist in 1968. Then in 2014, after its congregation was merged with Saint Paul's United Methodist Church, it was renamed Crossroads United Methodist Church. It was built in 1881 in a High Victorian Gothic style. The building was added to the National Register of Historic Places in 1979.

William McKinley, 25th President of the United States, was an active member of the church. He served as a Trustee and Sunday School superintendent. His funeral was held here September 19, 1901. Thomas Edison recorded video of McKinley's funeral including the body leaving the church.

The service was attended by the new President Theodore Roosevelt and a large delegation of Senate and House members and U.S. Supreme Court justices. The Congressional party filled the entire east section of the pews and the rear half of the two central sections. Generals and admirals in full dress uniform served as the honor guard and occupied the first pew on either side of the center aisle. President Roosevelt and the Cabinet - dressed in black, including black gloves - sat in the second pew of the east side of the center aisle. The fourth pew from the front, which had always been reserved for President McKinley, was draped in black and remained vacant. The Sunday school area and the balcony were filled by citizens and representatives of organizations. This included the Twenty-Third Ohio Regiment, which brought tattered battle flags they carried during the Civil War.

After a procession through the city, McKinley's body was brought to the church as of Beethoven's Grand Funeral March was played on organ. The service began at 2 p.m. with a quartet singing "Beautiful Isle of Somewhere" and then a prayer and invocation by Rev. O.B. Milligan, pastor of the First Presbyterian Church where the McKinleys had been married. Other pastors offering prayers were Dr. John A. Hall of Trinity Lutheran Church and Rev. E. P. Herburck.

The 24-minute eulogy was given by Rev. C.E. Manchester. He said in part:

"Our President is dead. The silver cord is loosed, the golden bow is broken, the pitcher is broken at the fountain, the wheel broken at the cistern.....We can hardly believe it. We had hoped and prayed, and it seemed that our hopes were to be realized and our prayers answered, when the emotion of joy was changed to one of grave apprehension. Still we waited, for we said, 'It may be that God will be gracious and merciful unto us.' It seemed to be us that it must be His will to spare the life of one so well beloved and so much needed. Thus, alternating between hope and fear, the weary hours passed on. Then came the tidings of defeated sciences, of the failure of love and prayer to hold its object to the earth. We seemed to hear the faintly muttered words, "good-by, all; good-bye. It's God's will. His will be done,' and then "Nearer, My God, to Thee.'

Bishop I.W. Joyce of Minneapolis offered another prayer and the then the audience joined in singing of the hymn that McKinley had spoken on his deathbed "Nearer, My God, to Thee." Father Valtman, Chaplain for the Twenty-ninth Infantry, offered a final benediction before the coffin was taken up as the church organ played and borne from the church for the procession to West Lawn Cemetery. The body was led by the military guard in a double line from the entrance to the hearse. President Roosevelt and the Cabinet followed arm in arm followed by McKinley's relatives.
