= First United Methodist Church (Conway, Arkansas) =

Historic church in Arkansas, United States

- U.S. National Register of Historic Places
- U.S. Historic district – Contributing property
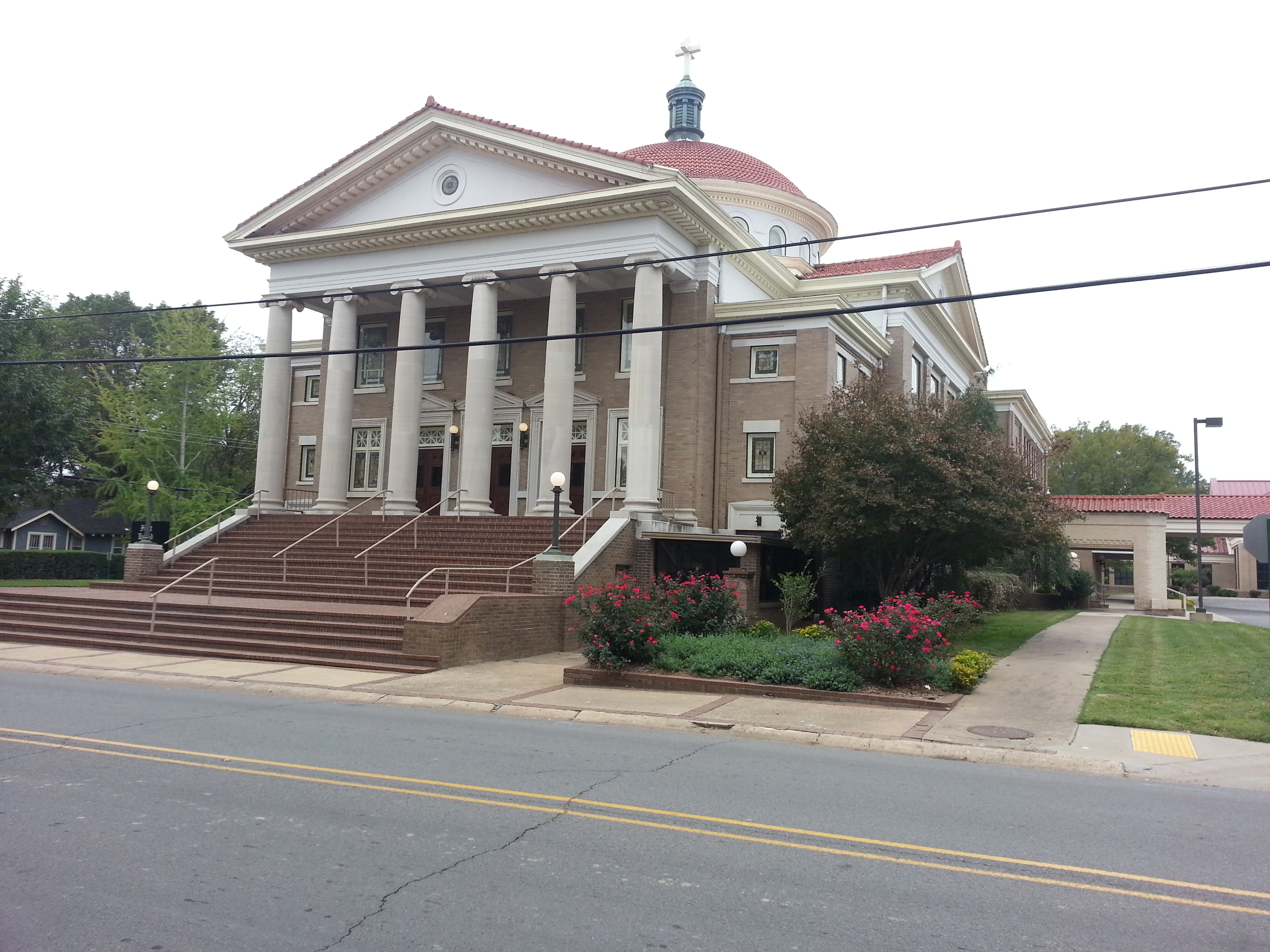

- Location within Arkansas Location within the United States
- Location: Jct. of Prince and Clifton Sts., NW corner, Conway, Arkansas
- Coordinates: 35°5′32″N 92°26′44″W
- Area: less than one acre
- Built: 1913
- Architect: George W. Kramer
- Architectural style: Classical Revival
- Part of: Robinson Historic District (ID00001645)
- NRHP reference No.: 92001623

Significant dates
- Added to NRHP: November 20, 1992
- Designated CP: January 29, 2001

First United Methodist Church is a historic Methodist church at the junction of Prince and Clifton Street in Conway, Arkansas. It is a two-story brick building with Classical Revival style, set on a raised foundation. The building is basically rectangular in shape, but its main roof is cruciform, with gables on all for sides, and a dome at the center. The front has a fully pedimented six-column Classical portico, with an entablature and dentillated pediment with a small round window at its center. The church was designed by George W. Kramer of New York City, and built in 1913 for a Methodist congregation founded in 1871.

The building was listed on the National Register of Historic Places in 1992.

== See also ==
- National Register of Historic Places listings in Faulkner County, Arkansas
