= Akron Public Library =

- U.S. National Register of Historic Places
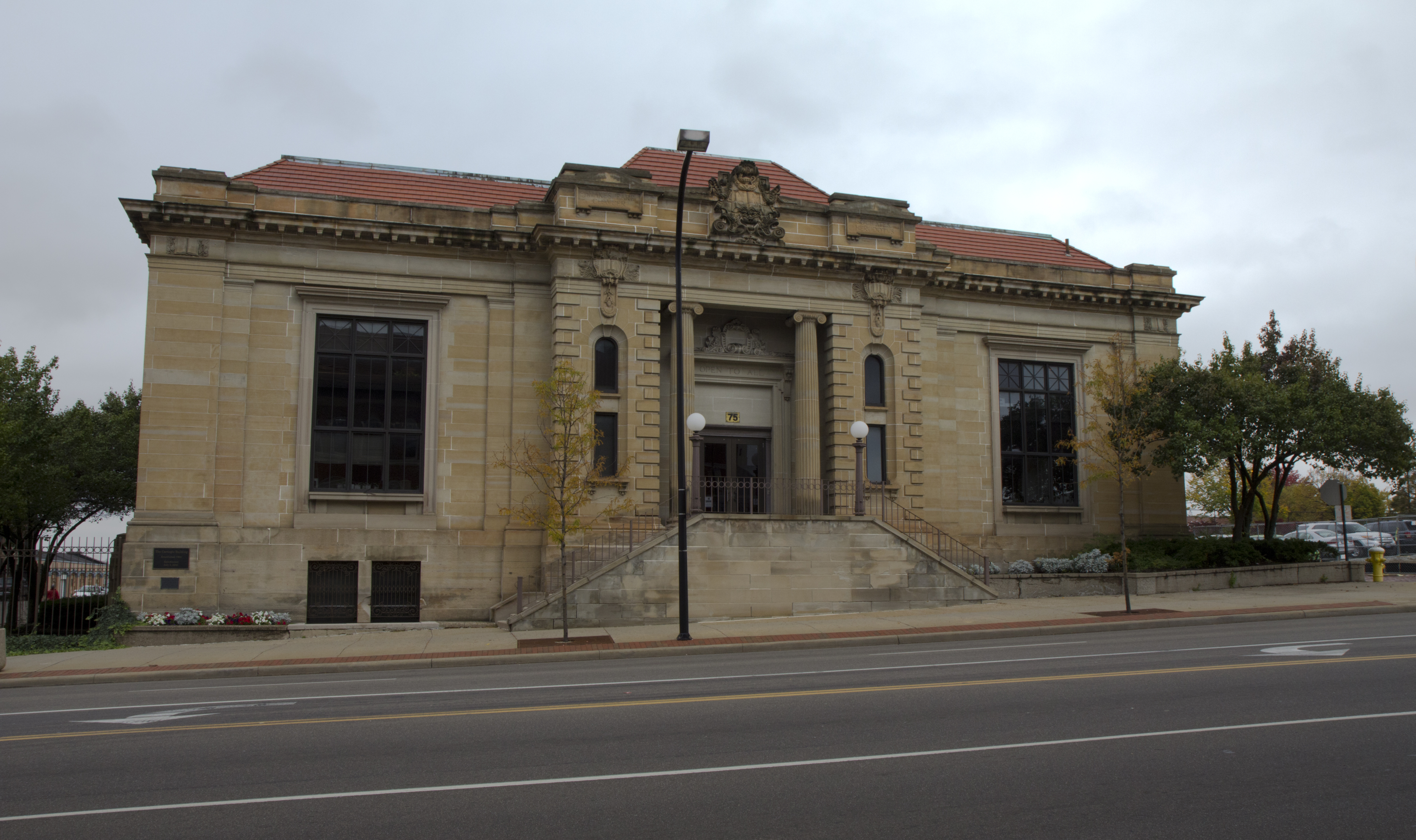
- Akron Public Library (Carnegie Building)

- Location within Ohio Location within the United States
- Location: 75 East Market Street Akron, Ohio
- Coordinates: 41°5′5.33″N 81°30′55.62″W
- Architect: Frank O. Weary
- Architectural style: Renaissance and Beaux-Arts
- NRHP reference No.: 83002060
- Added to NRHP: 1983-01-19

The Akron Public Library is located on the north-east corners of East Market Street and South High Street in downtown Akron, Ohio, United States. Also known as the Carnegie Building, it was built in 1904 using a donation of $82,000 from U.S. industrialist Andrew Carnegie. It was designed by Akron architect Frank O. Weary and is an example of Beaux Arts Classicism. It served as Akron's public library from 1904 to 1942, and as an art museum from 1922 to 1932 before being converted to office space. The building is currently occupied by Brennan, Manna & Diamond, LLC.

It was the first permanent home of the Akron Art Institute, from 1948 to 1981.

It is a monumental one-story block building, faced with "smooth-dressed coursed ashlar of Ohio buff sandstone. Elements of Beaux Arts style are its colossal columns, its detailed entablature, and parapet. Elements of French Renaissance sub-style are its mansard roof, the projecting front pavilion, and the "grotesque mask above the entry". It was regarded as one of Weary's best works.

The building was listed in the National Register of Historic Places on January 19, 1983.

== Historic uses ==
- Library
- Museum
- Office space
