= Parkville, Hartford, Connecticut =

Historic district in Connecticut, United States

- Parkville Historic District
- U.S. National Register of Historic Places
- U.S. Historic district
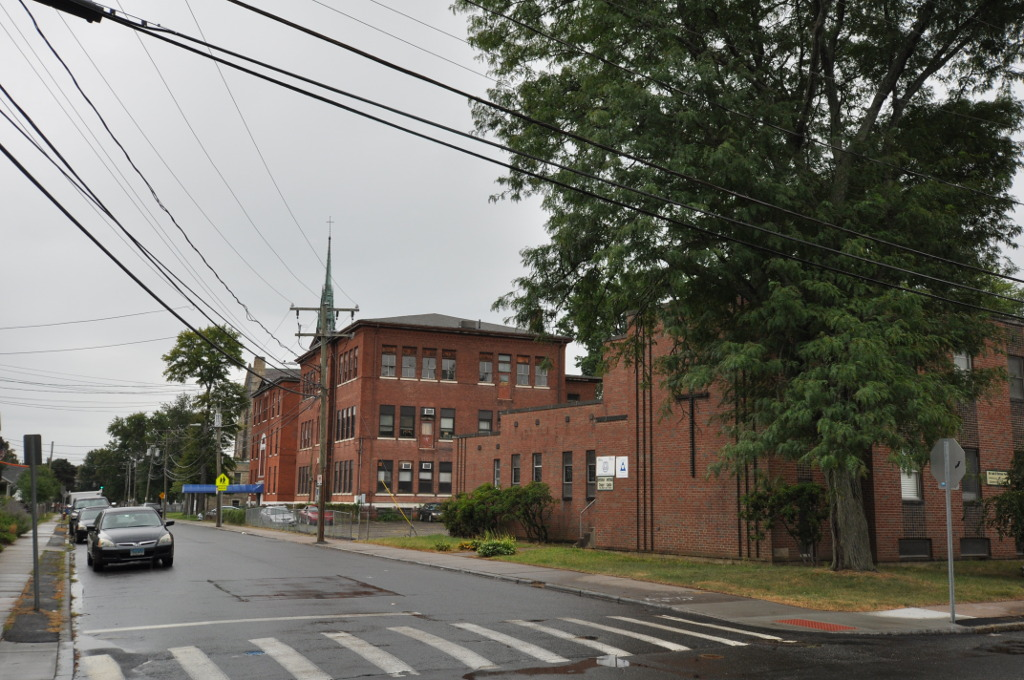

- Location within Connecticut Location within the United States
- Location: Roughly bounded by I-84, Park Highway, Francis Court, New Park & Sisson Avenues, Hartford, Connecticut
- Coordinates: 41°45′13″N 72°42′28″W
- Area: 155 acres (63 ha)
- NRHP reference No.: 15000112
- Added to NRHP: March 31, 2015

Parkville is a neighborhood on the West Side of Hartford, Connecticut. Centered on Park Street and stretching from the Railroad Overpass just West of Pope Park to the West Hartford Town line, and Capitol Avenue to I-84, Parkville is a densely developed, mixed-use neighborhood that is mainly working-class. Its name is derived from its placement at the Junction of the North and South Branches of the now-subterranean Park River. Most of the Eastern half of the neighborhood (roughly from New Park Avenue East) was listed as a historic district on the National Register of Historic Places in 2015.

== History and development ==
The area was primarily farmland through much of the 19th century, and was one of Hartford's last areas to develop. The largely rural residents tried to secede from Hartford, claiming they were over-taxed merely because their land was not as developed compared to more industrial areas such as nearby Frog Hollow. However, by 1873, Michael Kane established a brickyard off New Park Avenue, and heralded a period of industrial development that would stimulate rapid growth in a previously isolated part of the city. The Kane Brickyard quickly became one of leading brick-makers in the state, providing materials for projects such as Trinity College, the Travelers Tower, The Hartford Times Building, the state library and the Connecticut State Capitol building. The subsequent decades saw several major factories set up shop in the area, including the Pope Manufacturing Company, Underwood Typewriter Company, Royal Typewriter Company, the Gray Pay Telephone Company and Hartford Rubber Works. As Underwood and Royal expanded in the early 20th century, Hartford became known within some circles as the "Typewriter Capital of the World."

The highly skilled jobs that these factories provided attracted successive waves of new arrivals; Irish first followed by French-Canadian, Scandinavian and German immigrants. Population growth of course stimulated housing development, and the first housing developers bought out farmland and laid out several streets with small house lots designed for working-class people in 1871. Houses built between 1890 and 1917 make up the bulk of Parkville‟s existing housing stock.

The post World War II era and the construction of Interstate 84 proved a major disruption to Parkville. The more established middle-class families began migrating to the suburbs, and were replaced by new immigrants and people moving from other parts of the city. By the mid 1960s the Portuguese community had made Parkville its home, establishing small businesses along Park Street. Today, the neighborhood has a large population of Brazilians, Puerto Ricans, Caribbean and American Blacks.

Real Art Ways, established in 1975 in downtown Hartford and currently housed in the former Underwood Typewriter building on Arbor Street, brings creative energy to the neighborhood with its offerings of contemporary arts exhibits, live art performances, movies, wi-fi lounge, special programs and community involvement. Also in the Arbor Street building are offices, artists' studios and the Hartford Preservation Alliance, which works to preserve Hartford's architecture.

Parkville station is one of four in Hartford on the CTfastrak bus rapid transit line connecting Downtown to New Britain.

== See also ==
- National Register of Historic Places listings in Hartford, Connecticut
