= Next Step Community Church =

Church in Brooklyn, New York

- Baptist Temple
- U.S. National Register of Historic Places
- New York State Register of Historic Places
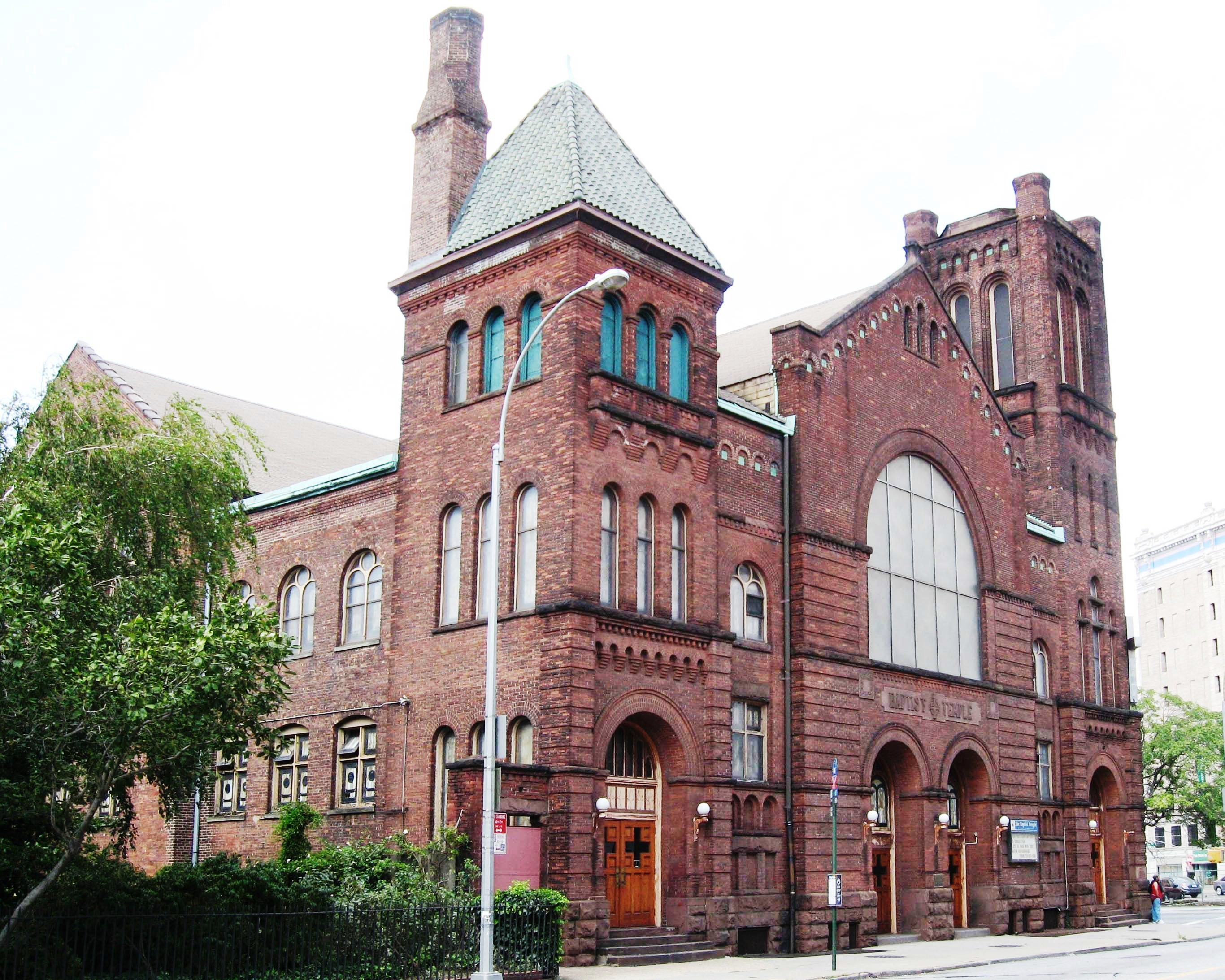
- Baptist Temple, August 2008

- Location within New York City Location within New York Location within the United States
- Location: 360 Schermerhorn St., Brooklyn, New York
- Coordinates: 40°41′11″N 73°58′48″W
- Area: less than one acre
- Built: 1894
- Architect: Weary & Kramer; Dodge & Morrison
- Architectural style: Romanesque
- NRHP reference No.: 95001334
- NYSRHP No.: 04701.013840

Significant dates
- Added to NRHP: November 20, 1995
- Designated NYSRHP: September 28, 2005

Next Step Community Church is a historic non-denominational evangelical Christian church at 360 Schermerhorn Street and Third Avenue in Brooklyn, New York. It was built in 1893–1894 in the Romanesque Revival style and rebuilt after a fire in 1917–1918. It has a brownstone base and superstructure faced with subtly textured brick with brownstone trim. The building features a large rose window and three corner towers. Edward Morris Bowman was the church's first organist and choirmaster. He led a large chorus and orchestra at the church from 1894-1906 that gained a national reputation.

It is a work of architects Weary & Kramer, and it is a work of Dodge & Morrison.

It was listed on the National Register of Historic Places in 1995 under the name Baptist Temple. The historic pipe organ was undergoing a multi-year restoration at the time. It was seriously damaged in a three-alarm fire that broke out on July 7, 2010.

In 2022, it became nondenominational and was renamed Next Step Community Church.
