= First United Methodist Church (Birmingham, Alabama) =

Historic church in Alabama, United States

- U.S. National Register of Historic Places
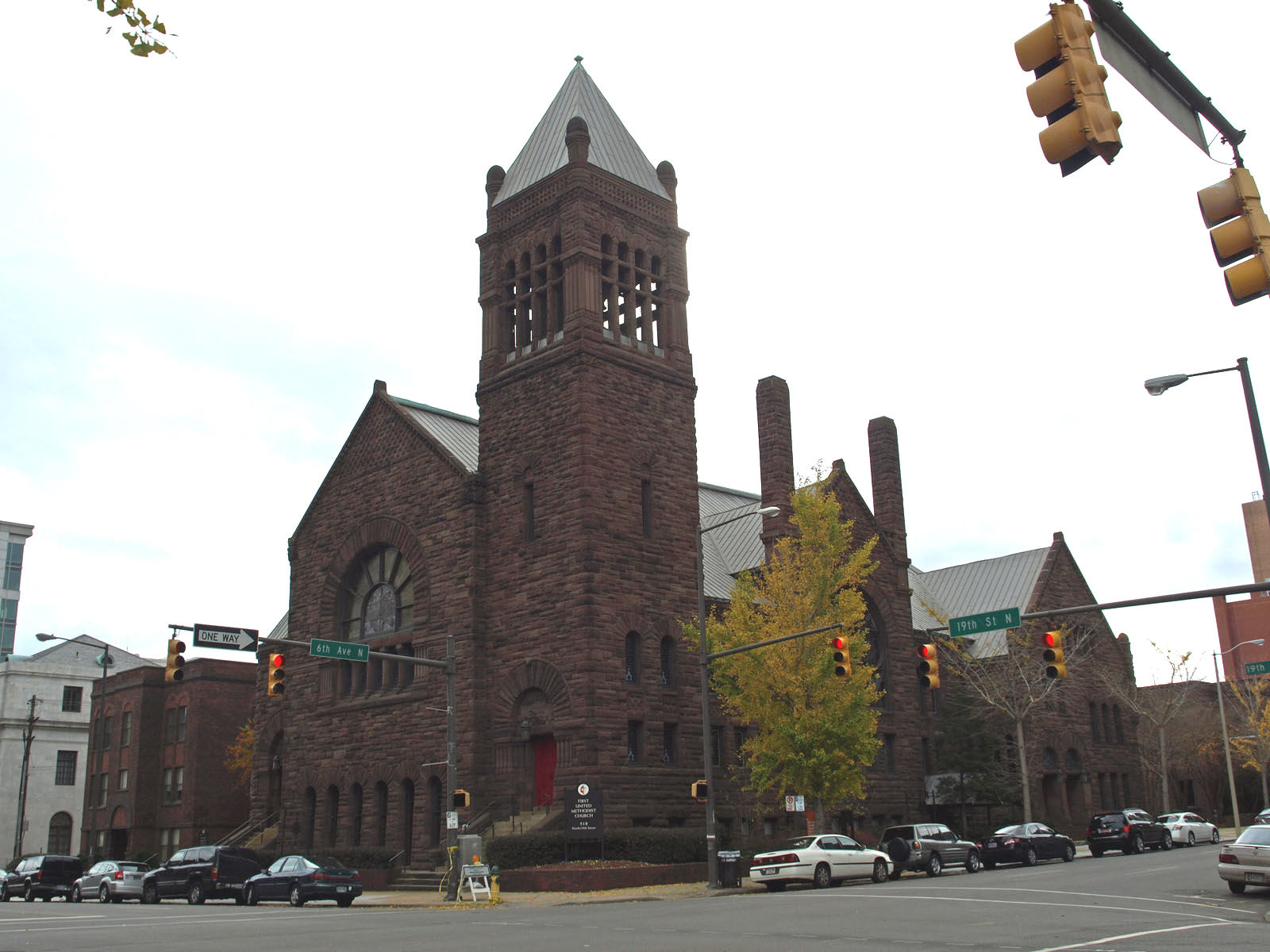

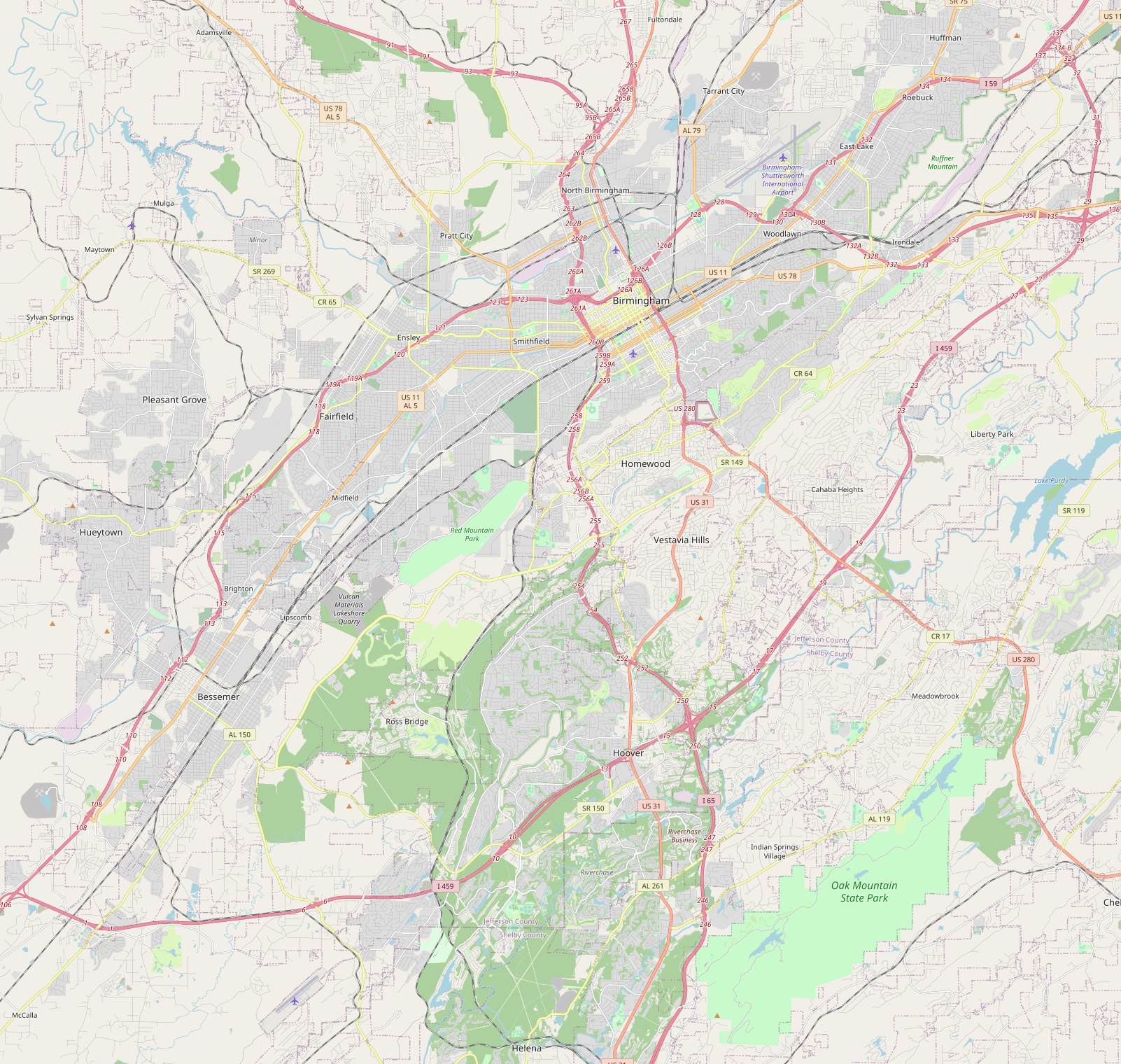
- Location within Birmingham, Alabama Location within Alabama Location within the United States
- Location: 6th Ave. and 19th St., N, Birmingham, Alabama
- Coordinates: 33°31′6″N 86°48′38″W
- Area: 0.7 acres (0.28 ha)
- Built: 1891
- Architect: Weary & Kramer
- Architectural style: Neo-romanesque
- NRHP reference No.: 82001605
- Added to NRHP: December 27, 1982

First United Methodist Church is a historic church at 6th Ave. and 19th Street, North in Birmingham, Alabama. It was built in 1891 and added to the National Register of Historic Places in 1982.

By the 2010s, the congregation often used the name First Church Birmingham and was known for its emphasis on inclusion and social justice.
