= Tambour door =

Type of door

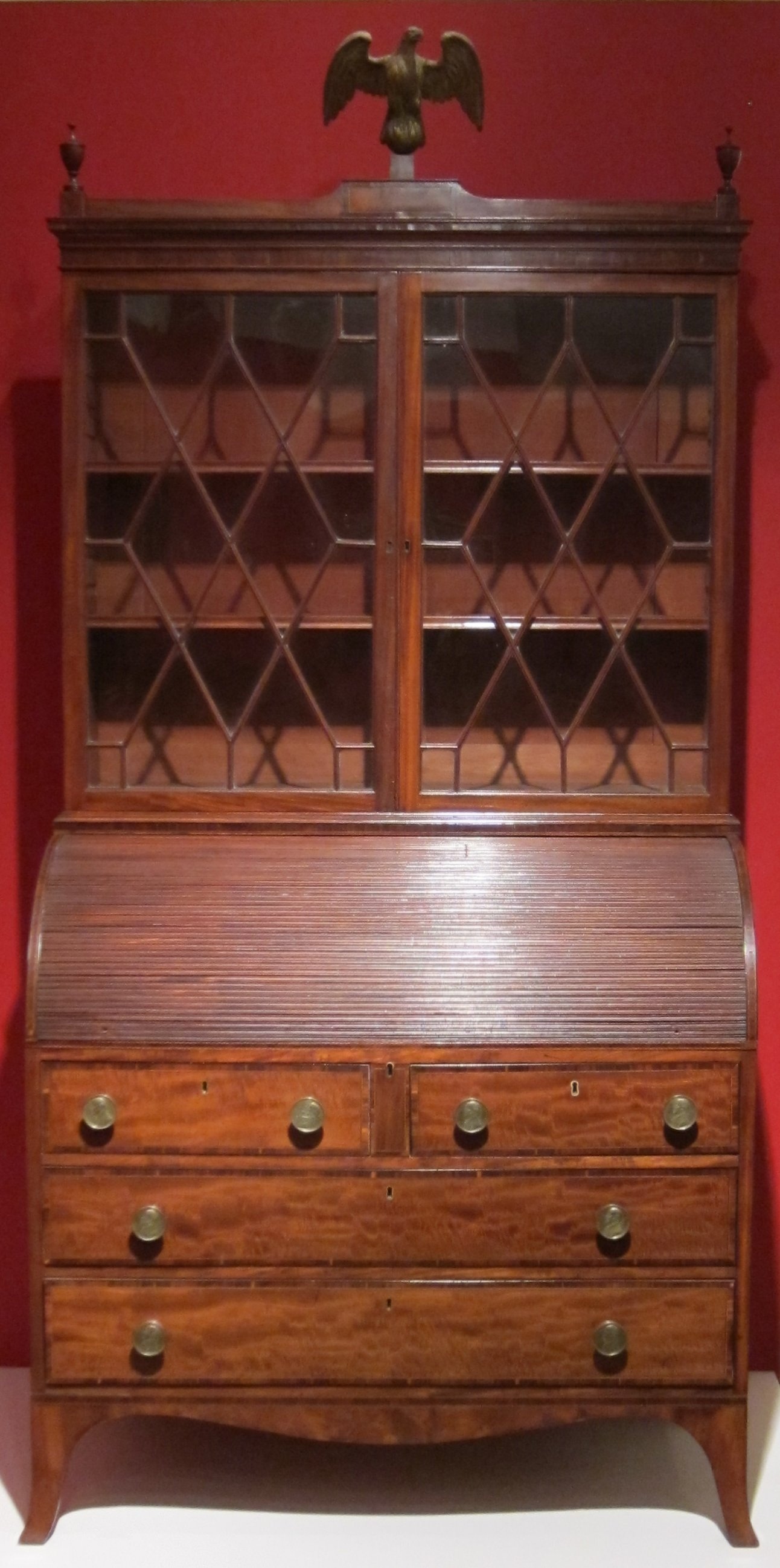
Tambour desk

A tambour door is a type of door constructed of horizontal or vertical slats that opens to the side or up and down by sliding along tracks. It is used on rolltop desks. Tambour doors can be either vertical or horizontal.

Examples of tambour doors

Vertical tambour, with one side open

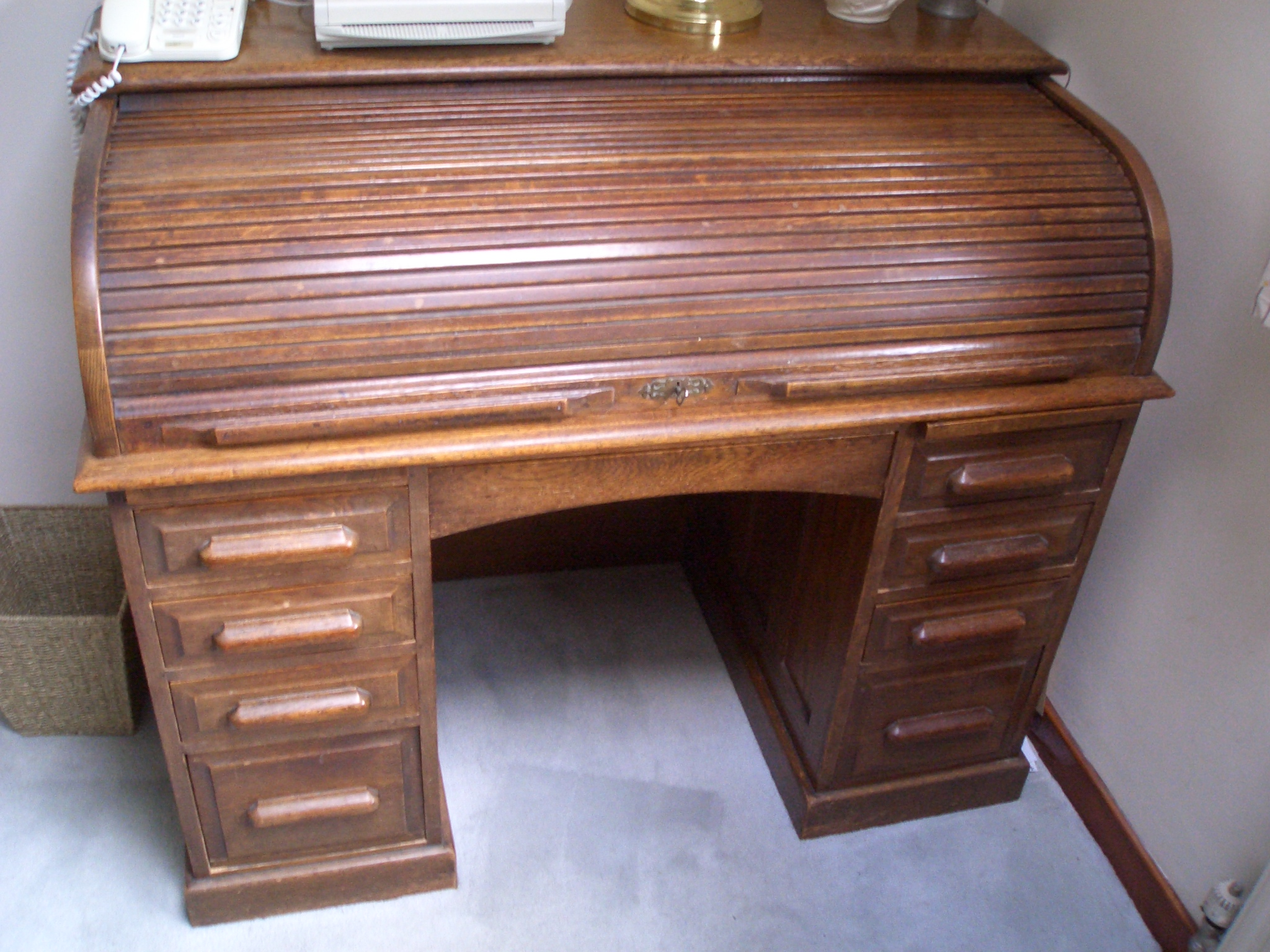
Rolltop desk

Horizontal window coverings

Tambour doors can be very wide
