= Akron Plan =

Architectural plan for church buildings

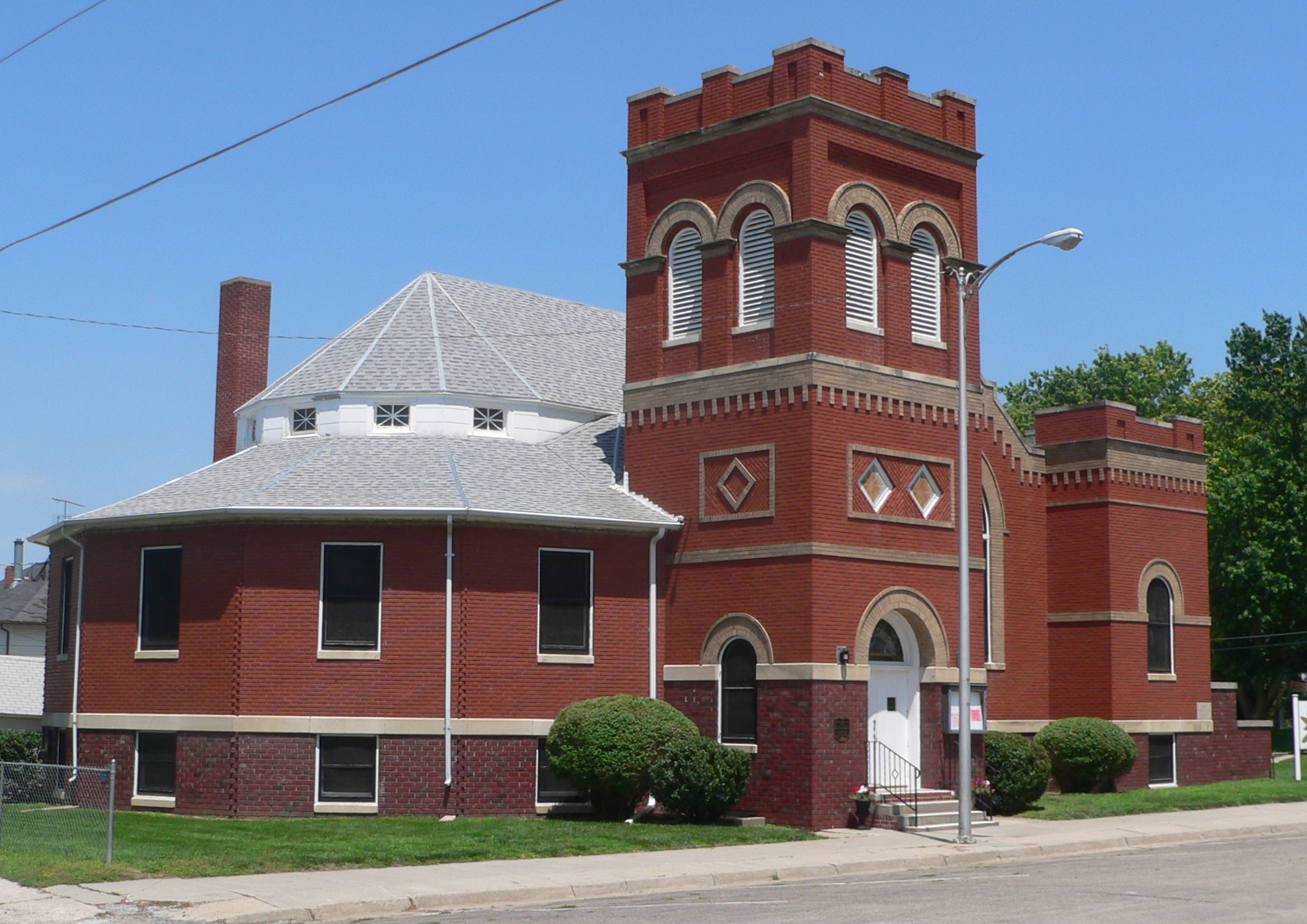
1914 Akron Plan church. The polygonal projection at left holds six Sunday-school rooms.

The Akron Plan or auditorium plan was a scheme for the design of churches and other religious buildings that housed Sunday schools. It was characterized by a set of wedge-shaped classrooms that radiated from the direction of a central superintendent's platform. Doors or movable partitions could be closed to separate the classes, or opened to allow the entire body of pupils to participate in school-wide exercises or provide for overflow seating.

Until about 1860, Sunday-school pupils of all ages were taught together in a single large room. After that, there was an increasing tendency for pupils to be taught separately, with instruction tailored to their ages, for most of the session. However, the superintendent conducted all-school exercises at the beginning and end of the session. To facilitate this, the building's interior layout had to enable the students to be quickly and efficiently divided into classes or brought together in a single body.

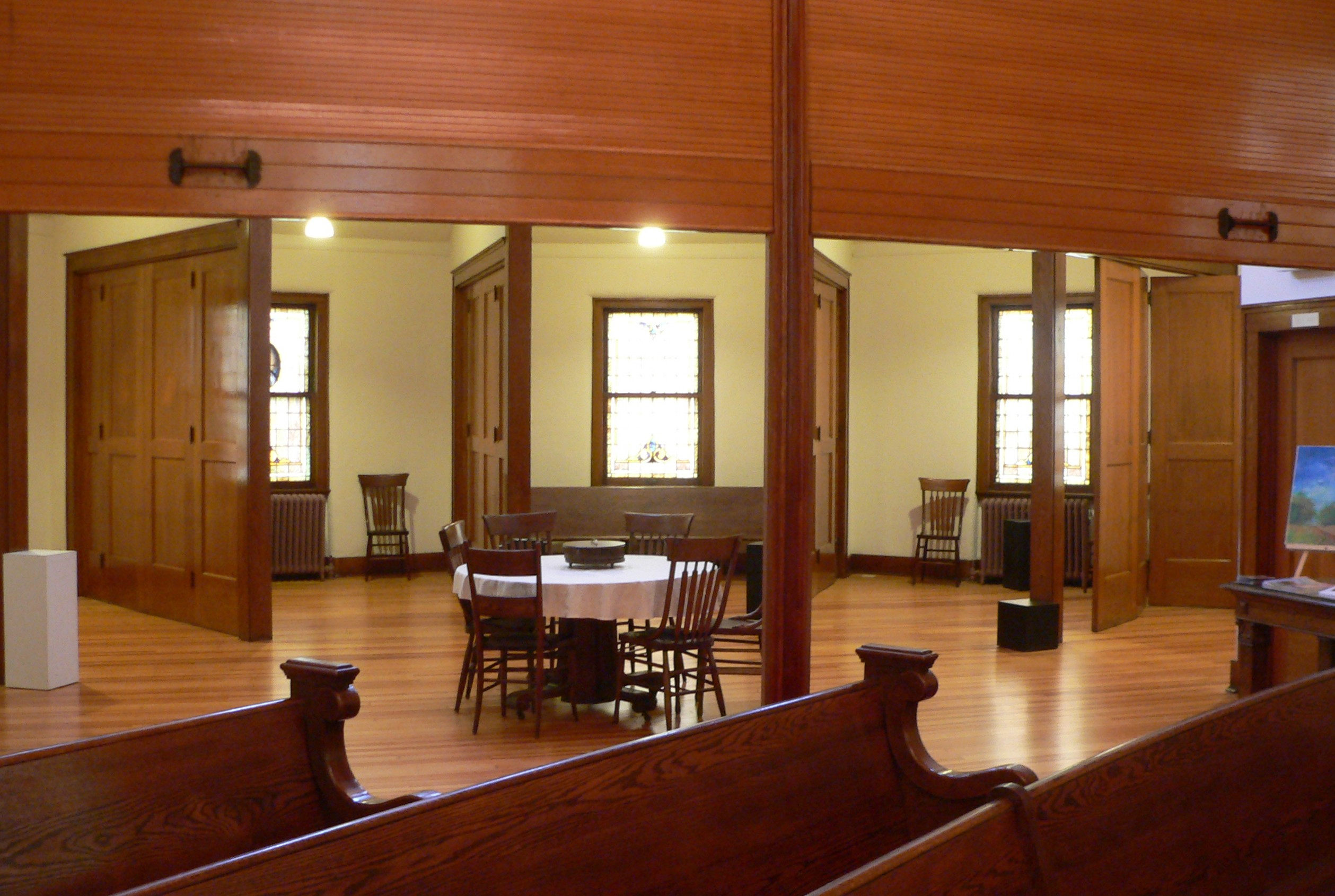
Interior of 1914 Akron Plan church: Sunday-school rooms, seen from sanctuary through tambour doors

The Akron Plan was devised to address this need and the desire to provide improved acoustics in line with cutting-edge science of the time and break down both the distance and symbolic barriers between clergy and the laity. It took its name from the city of Akron in the state of Ohio in the Great Lakes region of the United States, where it was pioneered for the construction of a church built in 1866–67. It was quickly adopted by Protestant churches across the United States, who incorporated more Richardsonian Romaneque design than the Gothic Revival style typical of more conventional symmetrical churches.

The plan fell out of favor in the early 20th century, when Sunday schools changed their approach to one in which pupils were taught separately for the entire session, eliminating the school-wide exercises. The awkwardly shaped and imperfectly soundproofed rooms were poorly adapted for this new approach, and many of them underwent extensive remodeling. By the beginning of the 21st century, few intact Akron Plan interiors remained in existence.

== Sunday schools, 1780–1872 ==
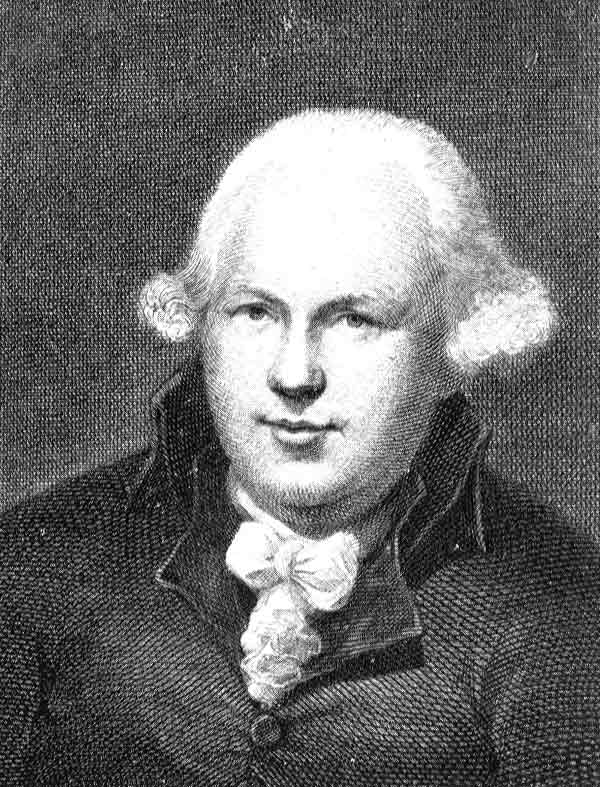
Robert Raikes

The genesis of the Sunday school occurred in 1780 in Gloucester, England, when philanthropist Robert Raikes arranged for the teaching of a measure of literacy and religious instruction to slum children, most of whom worked six days a week and had Sunday as their only free day. The experiment proved successful and was taken up elsewhere; by Raikes's death in 1811, Sunday-school pupils numbered about a quarter-million, throughout the British Isles and in the United States.

With the passage of time, the exclusive focus on lower-class children was abandoned. The expansion to upper classes was pioneered by, among others, noted divine Lyman Beecher, who in about 1830 sent his children to Sunday school, and encouraged his neighbors to do likewise. Instruction in reading and writing was dropped, and the schools devoted themselves to religious education.

Through the first quarter of the 19th century, religious instruction in Sunday schools took the form of rote memorization of extensive passages from the Bible or the catechism; pupils might be tasked with memorizing as many as 300 verses a week. In about 1826, this began to give way to a new system, the "selected lesson" or "limited lesson", wherein all pupils were given the same relatively short excerpt from Scripture to memorize, and were taught the passage's meaning and significance.

Until about 1860, Sunday school was usually conducted in a single large room, with pupils of all ages learning the same lesson. This allowed all members of a family to discuss the lesson at home after church; but it was difficult to devise lessons that would be useful to all members of such a heterogeneous set of pupils, and the mix of ages tended to give rise to disciplinary problems. In response to this, and in keeping with the practice in the public schools, Sunday schools began to be divided into grades. In 1872, a national Sunday school convention adopted the Uniform Lesson Plan, wherein all students would study the same Scriptural passage but would be taught in a manner appropriate to their age.

== Uniform Lessons and Akron Plan ==
Under the Uniform Lesson Plan, the grades were not to be kept separate for the entire duration of the session. Rather, the class was to begin with devotional exercises, led by the superintendent and involving the entire body of pupils. After this, the grades were to be taught separately. The session would end with the superintendent's leading, and the whole body's participating in, a five-minute review of the lesson followed by closing exercises.

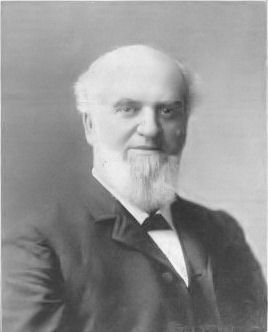
Lewis Miller

This created a challenge for ecclesiastical architects. The Sunday-school building had to be designed in such a way that the pupils could quickly and efficiently be separated according to their various grades, and brought together for whole-school activities. John H. Vincent, an authority on Sunday schools in the Methodist Episcopal Church and later a bishop, described the architectural requirements: "Provide for togetherness and separateness; have a room in which the whole school can be brought together in a moment for simultaneous exercises, and with a minimum of movement can be divided into classes for uninterrupted classwork".

One of those who addressed the design problem was Lewis Miller. A wealthy inventor and industrialist, Miller supervised a Sunday school in Canton, Ohio, and later one in Akron. There, he employed the graded system and experienced the problems that arose from unsuitable building designs.

When the First Methodist Episcopal Church of Akron decided to construct a new building, Miller interested himself in the building's design. Working with architects Walter Blythe of Cleveland and Jacob Snyder of Akron, he devised a plan in which wedge-shaped classrooms were separated by partitions radiating from the direction of a central superintendent's platform. Doors on the platform-facing side of each classroom could be closed during grade-separated lessons, or opened to allow all pupils to see and hear the superintendent during school-wide exercises. The new church, following these plans, was constructed in 1866–67.

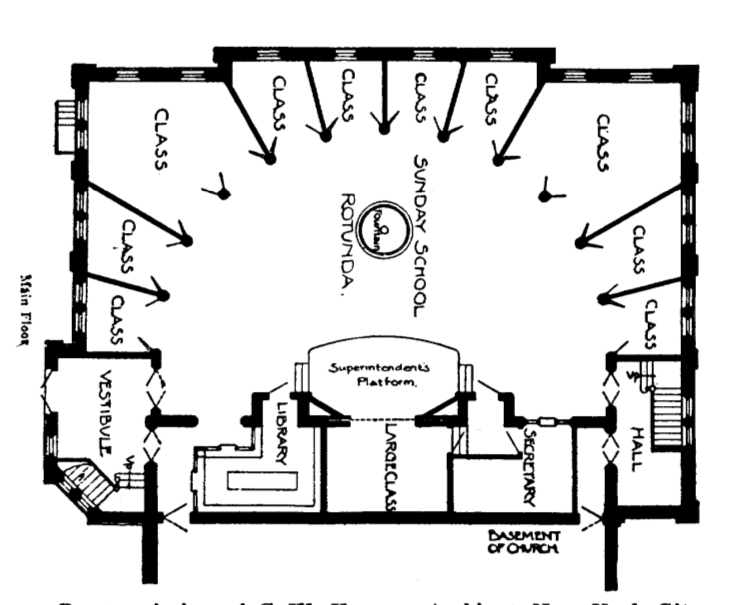
Original Akron Plan: main floor (balcony floor not shown)

The so-called Akron Plan was adopted by Protestant churches throughout the United States and the world, particularly after 1872, when the Fifth National Sunday-School Convention adopted the Uniform Lesson Plan. A 1911 American publication stated that "This plan for the Sunday-school building has been almost universally adopted in this country", and a 1914 publication stated that of the churches built in the preceding fifty years, three-quarters of those that made provisions for Sunday schools had used some version of the Akron Plan. The Akron Plan was popular in early Christian Science Sunday school designs. Gurneyites were the only Quaker branch to adopt the Akron Plan. Many of these churches modified the design with the addition of a movable partition between the sanctuary and the Sunday-school spaces, allowing the Sunday-school classes and the main body of congregants to be separated or united.

== Decline ==
The Akron Plan was not without its failings. The divisions between the classrooms impeded worship by the whole body of pupils, compared to how they might have acted in a single large space. The wedge-shaped rooms were often poorly lighted and ventilated. Flimsy partitions and doors did not suffice to exclude distracting noises.

In the early 20th century, the Uniform Lesson Plan began to fall out of favor. The requirement that the same Scriptural passages be taught to pupils of all grades was seen as unduly constraining: passages that adults could profitably study might be meaningless to small children. Moreover, the exclusive focus on Biblical passages made it difficult to study such things as church history and organization, missions, and latter-day issues such as temperance.

In 1908, a convention of the International Sunday School Association approved the development of completely graded lesson plans. These were adopted by 35,000 Sunday schools during the following five years. With the different grades no longer studying the same topic during a given week, there was no longer a place for the superintendent's review of the whole school. School-wide assemblies became infrequent, eliminating the need for a means of quickly bringing the whole body of pupils together.

The change in Sunday-school organization did away with the advantages of the Akron Plan. The oddly shaped rooms could not readily be turned to other purposes without extensive modification. While Akron Plan churches continued to be built into the 1920s and 1930s, many existing churches were remodeled to create more useful interior spaces. By the beginning of the 21st century, few intact Akron Plan interiors remained.

== See also ==
- Partners for Sacred Places
