= Black Methodism in the United States =

Black Methodism in the United States is the Methodist tradition within the Black Church, largely consisting of congregations in the African Methodist Episcopal (AME), African Methodist Episcopal Zion (AME Zion or AMEZ), and Christian Methodist Episcopal denominations, as well as those African American congregations in other Methodist denominations, such as the Free Methodist Church.

African Americans were drawn to Methodism due to the father of Methodism, John Wesley's "opposition to the whole system of slavery, his commitment to Jesus Christ, and the evangelical appeal to the suffering and the oppressed."

== History ==
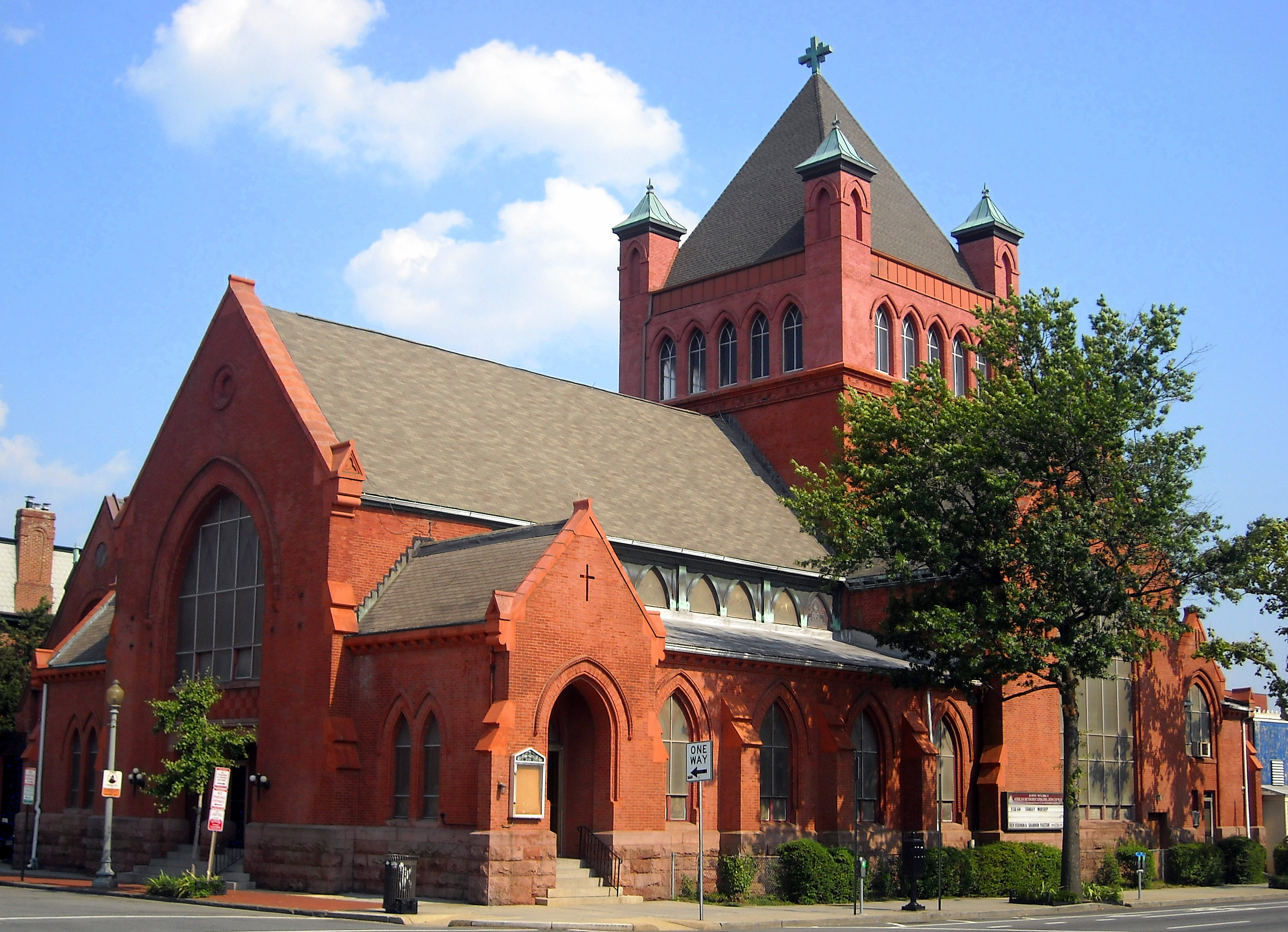
John Wesley AME Zion Church (est. 1847), located in the Logan Circle neighborhood of Washington, D.C.

=== Historically black Methodist denominations ===
==== AMEZ ====
The African Methodist Episcopal Zion church evolved as a division within the Methodist Episcopal Church denomination. The first AME Zion church was founded in 1800. Like the AME Church, the AME Zion Church sent missionaries to Africa in the first decade after the American Civil War and it also has a continuing overseas presence.

==== AME ====
The African Methodist Episcopal Church was founded by Richard Allen in Philadelphia, Pennsylvania, in 1816, and also split from the white-dominated Methodist Episcopal Church denomination to make an independent denomination. Sarah Allen was known as its "founding mother". It is based in the United States but seven of its 20 districts are overseas, including in Liberia, the United Kingdom, Angola, and South Africa. Its Women's Missionary Service, an NGO, operates in 32 countries.

=== Other Methodist denominations ===
==== Free Methodist Church ====
In the Free Methodist Church, African Heritage Network convenes to encourage black congregations and clergy within the denomination.

== Intercommunion ==
Both the AME and the AMEZ churches have entered in full communion with one another and with the United Methodist Church, the African Union Methodist Protestant Church, the Christian Methodist Episcopal Church, and the Union American Methodist Episcopal Church.

== List of notable congregations ==
=== United States ===
National Register of Historic Places

Church/Temple	City	State
Adams Chapel AME Church	Rock Hill	South Carolina
Allen Temple AME Church	Oakland	California
Allen Temple AME Church	Atlanta	Georgia
Allen Temple AME Church	Byron	Georgia
Allen Chapel AME Church	Lincoln	Illinois
Allen Chapel AME Church	Terre Haute	Indiana
Allen Chapel AME Church	Silver Spring	Maryland
Allen Chapel AME Church	Kalamazoo	Michigan
Greater Allen AME Cathedral	Queens	New York
Allen Temple AME Church	Cincinnati	Ohio
Allen AME Church	Portland	Oregon
Greater Allen AME Church	Dayton	Ohio
Allen AME Church	Providence	Rhode Island
Allen Temple AME Church	Greenville	South Carolina
Allen Chapel AME Church	Murfreesboro	Tennessee
Allen Chapel AME Church	Fort Worth	Texas
Allen Chapel AME Church	Washington	DC
Asbury AME Church	Chester	Pennsylvania
Asbury Chapel AME Church	Louisville	Kentucky
Baber AME Church	Carrier Mills	Illinois
Baber AME Church	Rochester	New York
Big Bethel AME Church	Atlanta	Georgia
Bethel AME Church	Batesville	Arkansas
Bethel AME Church	Malvern	Arkansas
Bethel AME Church	Oxnard	California
Bethel AME Church	DeLand	Florida
Greater Bethel AME Church	Miami	Florida
Bethel AME Church	Acworth	Georgia
Bethel AME Church	Cedar Rapids	Iowa
Bethel AME Church	Davenport	Iowa
Bethel AME Church	Iowa City	Iowa
Bethel AME Church	Champaign	Illinois
Bethel AME Church	Crawfordsville	Indiana
Bethel AME Church	Hammond	Indiana
Bethel AME Church	Indianapolis	Indiana
Bethel AME Church	Richmond	Indiana
Bethel AME Church	Coffeyville	Kansas
Bethel AME Church	Manhattan	Kansas
Bethel AME Church	Shelbyville	Kentucky
Union Bethel AME Church	New Orleans	Louisiana
Bethel AME Church	Baltimore	Maryland
Bethel AME Church	Jamaica Plain	Massachusetts
Bethel AME Church and Parsonage	Plymouth	Massachusetts
Bethel AME Church	Vicksburg	Mississippi
Bethel Chapel AME Church	Louisiana	Missouri
Union Bethel AME Church	Great Falls	Montana
Bethel AME Church	Reno	Nevada
Bethel AME Church	Morristown	New Jersey
Bethel AME Church	Springtown	New Jersey
Greater Bethel AME Church	Harlem	New York
Bethel AME Church and Manse	Huntington	New York
Bethel AME Church	Reidsville	North Carolina
Bethel AME Church	Greensboro	North Carolina
Bethel AME Church	Middletown	Ohio
Bethel AME Zion Church	Aliquippa	Pennsylvania
Bethel AME Church	Monongahela City	Pennsylvania
Bethel AME Church	Reading	Pennsylvania
Bethel AME Church	Anderson	South Carolina
Bethel AME Church	Columbia	South Carolina
Bethel AME Church	McClellanville	South Carolina
Bethel AME Church	Brittons Neck	South Carolina
Mother Bethel AME Church	Philadelphia	Pennsylvania
Bethel AME Church	Providence	Rhode Island
Bethel Temple	Fort Worth	Texas
Bethel AME Church	San Antonio	Texas
Third Street Bethel AME Church	Richmond	Virginia
Bethel AME Church	Saint Croix	US Virgin Islands
Bethel AME Church	Parkersburg	West Virginia
Brown Chapel AME Church	Selma	Alabama
Brown Chapel AME Church	Pittsburgh	Pennsylvania
Brown Chapel AME Church	Houston	Texas
Bryant Chapel AME Church	Birmingham	Alabama
Brookins Community AME Church	Los Angeles	California
Byrd's AME Church	Clayton	Delaware
Campbell Chapel AME Church	Americus	Georgia
Campbell Chapel AME Church	Atchison	Kansas
Campbell Chapel AME Church	Glasgow	Missouri
Campbell Chapel AME Church	Pulaski	Tennessee
Campbell AME Church	Philadelphia	Pennsylvania
Christ Our Redeemer AME Church	Irvine	California
Ebenezer AME Church	Baltimore	Maryland
Emanuel AME Church	Charleston	South Carolina
Emanuel AME Church	Mobile	Alabama
Emmanuel AME Church	Durham	North Carolina
Empowerment Temple AME Church	Baltimore	Maryland
Grant AME Church	Chesilhurst	New Jersey
Grant AME Church	Roxbury	Massachusetts
Grant AME Church	Los Angeles	California
Jericho AME Church	Beaufort	South Carolina
Johnson's Chapel AME Church	Springfield	Kentucky
Joshua Chapel AME Church	Waxahachie	Texas
Mary Springhill A.M.E. Church	Shreveport	Shreveport
Mount Olive AME Church	Clearwater	Florida
Mount Olive AME Church	Ft. Myers	Florida
Mt. Pisgah AME Church	Greenwood	South Carolina
Mount Tabor AME Church	Kendrick	Florida
Mount Vernon AME Church	Gamaliel	Kentucky
Mount Vernon AME Church	Palestine	Texas
Mount Zion AME Zion Church	Montgomery	Alabama
Mount Zion AME Church	Jacksonville	Florida
Mount Zion AME Church	Ocala	Florida
Mount Zion AME Church	Montgomery Township	New Jersey
Mount Zion AME Church	Woolwich Township	New Jersey
Mount Zion AME Church	Tredyffrin Township	Pennsylvania
Mount Zion AME Church	Newport	Rhode Island
Mount Zion AME Church	Greeleyville	South Carolina
Mount Zion AME Church	Round O	South Carolina
Mount Zion AME Church	Norfolk	Virginia
Olive Chapel AME Church	Kirkwood	Missouri
Quinn Chapel AME Church	Chicago	Illinois
Quinn Chapel AME Church	Louisville	Kentucky
Quinn Chapel AME Church	St. Louis	Missouri
Reid Temple AME Church	Glenn Dale	Maryland
Rue Chapel AME Church	New Bern	North Carolina
Saint Philip AME Church	Atlanta	Georgia
Saint Phillips AME Church	Toomsboro	Georgia
St. John AME Church	Columbus	Georgia
St. John AME Church	Chicago	Illinois
St. John's AME Church	North Omaha	Nebraska
St. John AME Church	Cleveland	Ohio
St. John's AME Church	Norfolk	Virginia
St. James AME Church	Sanford	Florida
St. James AME Church	Ashland	Kentucky
St. James AME Church	Danville	Kentucky
Saint James AME Church	Picayune	Mississippi
St. James AME Church	Macon	Georgia
St. James AME Church	New Orleans	Louisiana
St. James AME Church (destroyed by arson in 1955)	Lake City	South Carolina
St. James' AME Church	Newark	New Jersey
St. James AME Zion Church	Ithaca	New York
St. Joseph's AME Church	Durham	North Carolina
St. Mark AME Church	Tuscaloosa	Alabama
St. Matthew's Chapel AME Church	Boonville	Missouri
St. Matthew AME Church	Philadelphia	Pennsylvania
St. Peter's AME Church	Harrodsburg	Kentucky
St. Peter's AME Zion Church	New Bern	North Carolina
St. Peter AME Church	Clarksville	Tennessee
St. Paul AME Church	Santa Barbara	California
St. Paul AME Church	Jacksonville	Florida
St. Paul AME Church	West Palm Beach	Florida
St. Paul AME Church	Glencoe	Illinois
St. Paul AME Church	Cambridge	Massachusetts
St. Paul AME Church	Port Huron	Michigan
St. Paul AME Church	Columbia	Missouri
St. Paul AME Church	St. Louis	Missouri
St. Paul AME Church	Raleigh	North Carolina
St. Paul AME Church	Fairfield	Ohio
St. Paul AME Church	Lima	Ohio
St. Paul's AME Church	Urbana	Ohio
St. Paul AME Church	Fayetteville	Tennessee
St. Paul AME Church	Rockwall	Texas
St. Paul AME Church	Dallas	Texas
Greater St. Paul AME Church	San Angelo	Texas
St. Paul AME Church	Manchester	Kentucky
St. Stephen's AME Church	Sandusky	Ohio
St. Stephen's AME Church	Hardeeville	South Carolina
Salter's Chapel AME Church	St. Helena Parish	Louisiana
Simpson-Poplar Springs AME Church	Mount Airy	Maryland
Tabernacle AME Church	Idlewild	Michigan
Thomas Memorial AME Zion Church	Watertown	New York
Thomas Chapel AME Zion Church	Black Mountain	North Carolina
Turner Chapel AME Church	Atlanta	Georgia
Turner Chapel AME Church	Marietta	Georgia
Turner Memorial AME Church	Hyattsville	Maryland
Wade Chapel AME Church	Hillsboro	Texas
Ward Chapel AME Church	Prattville	Alabama
Ward Chapel AME Church	Selma	Alabama
Ward Chapel AME Church	Muskogee	Oklahoma
Wayman Temple AME Church	Jacksonville	Florida
Wesley Chapel AME Church	Georgetown	Texas
Wesley Chapel AME Church	Houston	Texas
Wesley Chapel AME Church	San Marcos	Texas
Williams Chapel AME Church	Orangeburg	South Carolina
Woodlawn AME Church	Chicago	Illinois
Zion AME Church	Camden	Delaware

=== Liberia ===
- Eliza Turner AME Church, 34 Camp Johnson Road, Monrovia, founded in 1896
- Empowerment Temple AME Church, Carey Street, Monrovia
- Morning Star AME, Kingsville #7 Township, Careysburg District, Montserrado County.

== See also ==
- List of Methodist churches
- List of Methodist churches in the United States, which covers all or many of the U.S. ones above, amidst other Methodist churches, and is organized by state
