= St. Paul A.M.E. Church =

St. Paul A.M.E. Church or Saint Paul's African Methodist Episcopal Church or variations may refer to:

- St. Paul A.M.E. Church (Washington, D.C.)
- St. Paul A.M.E. Church (Apalachicola, Florida)
- St. Paul African Methodist Episcopal Church (Coatesville, Pennsylvania)
- St. Paul A.M.E. Church (Columbia, Missouri)
- St. Paul African Methodist Episcopal Church (Fayetteville, Tennessee)
- St. Paul AME Church (Chapel Hill, North Carolina)
- St. Paul A.M.E. Church (Raleigh, North Carolina)
- St. Paul's African Methodist Episcopal Church (Urbana, Ohio)
- St. Paul African Methodist Episcopal Church (West Palm Beach, Florida)

== See also ==
- St. Paul's Methodist Church (disambiguation)
