= St. James A. M. E. Church =

St. James A.M.E. Church and variations may refer to:

- St. James A. M. E. Church (Sanford, Florida)
- St. James AME Church (Ashland, Kentucky)
- St. James A. M. E. Church (Danville, Kentucky), listed on the NRHP in Boyle County
- St. James AME Church (New Orleans, Louisiana)
- St. James' A. M. E. Church (Newark, New Jersey)
- St. James AME Zion Church (Ithaca, New York)
- St. James AME Church (San Antonio, Texas)
- St. James A. M. E. Church (Darlington, South Carolina), built by Richard Humbert
