= Campbell Chapel African Methodist Episcopal Church =

Campbell Chapel African Methodist Episcopal Church or with AME abbreviation may refer to:

- Campbell Chapel AME Church (Americus, Georgia); listed on the NRHP
- Campbell Chapel AME Church (Atchison, Kansas)
- Campbell Chapel African Methodist Episcopal Church (Glasgow, Missouri)
- Campbell Chapel African Methodist Episcopal Church (Bluffton, South Carolina)
- Campbell Chapel African Methodist Episcopal Church (Pulaski, Tennessee)
