= Allen Chapel African Methodist Episcopal Church =

Allen Chapel African Methodist Episcopal Church may refer to:

- Allen Chapel African Methodist Episcopal Church (Lincoln, Illinois)
- Allen Chapel African Methodist Episcopal Church (Terre Haute, Indiana)
- Allen Chapel A.M.E. Church (Murfreesboro, Tennessee)
- Allen Chapel AME Church (Fort Worth, Texas)

== See also ==
- List of African Methodist Episcopal churches
