= Allen Chapel =

Allen Chapel may refer to:

- Allen Chapel, Texas, a community in Houston County
- Allen Chapel African Methodist Episcopal Church (disambiguation), one of several churches

== See also ==
- Allen's Chapel, Texas, a community in Fannin County
