= Mount Vernon African Methodist Episcopal Church =

Mount Vernon African Methodist Episcopal Church may refer to:

- Mount Vernon AME Church (Gamaliel, Kentucky)
- Mount Vernon African Methodist Episcopal Church (Palestine, Texas)
