= Allen Temple African Methodist Episcopal Church =

Allen Temple American Methodist Episcopal Church may refer to:

- Allen Temple AME Church (Cincinnati, Ohio)
- Allen Temple A.M.E. Church (Greenville, South Carolina)
