= Allen's Chapel, Texas =

Unincorporated community town in Texas, US

- Unincorporated community
- Location within Texas
- Coordinates: 33.6473252°N 95.9602488°W
- Country: United States
- State: Texas
- County: Fannin
- Elevation: 620 ft (189 m)

Allen Chapel is an unincorporated community Fannin County, Texas, United States. Situated on Farm to Market Road 1396, it split from Allen's Point. In the 1950s, its school district was consolidated by the Honey Grove Independent School District. As of 2000, its population is 41.
