= Union Bethel A.M.E. Church (New Orleans, Louisiana) =

Historic church in Louisiana, United States

- U.S. National Register of Historic Places
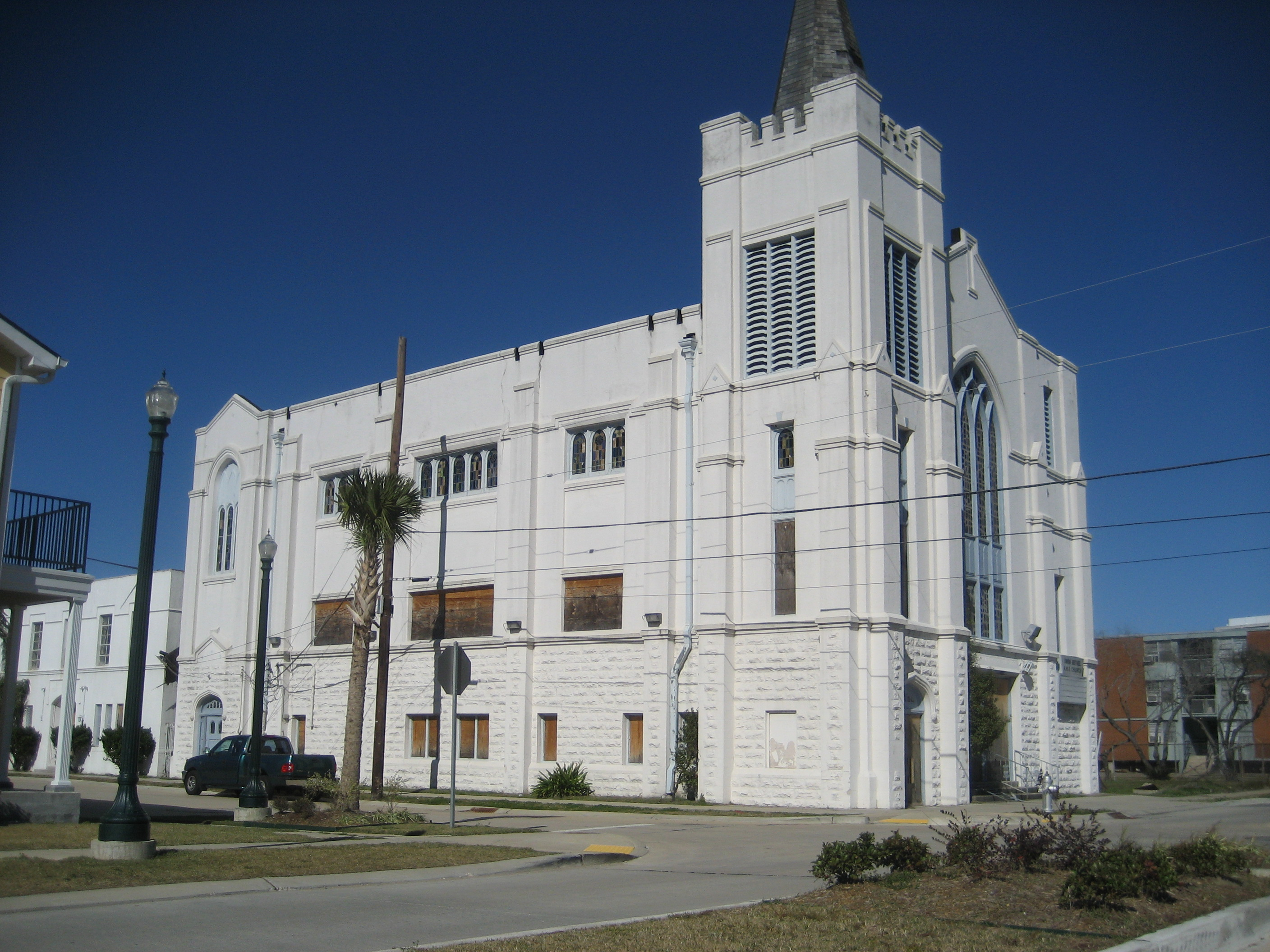

- Location within East New Orleans Location within Louisiana Location within the United States
- Location: 2321 Thalia, New Orleans, Louisiana
- Coordinates: 29°56′38″N 90°4′57″W
- Area: 1 acre (0.40 ha)
- Architect: Emile Weil
- Architectural style: Gothic Revival
- NRHP reference No.: 07001003
- Added to NRHP: September 24, 2007

The Union Bethel A.M.E. Church in New Orleans, Louisiana, at 2321 Thalia St. at the corner of Liberty St., is a historic African Methodist Episcopal church.

Its Gothic Revival building and the church's adjoining "Four Freedoms Building", was added to the National Register of Historic Places in 2007.

The church was founded in 1862 with the withdrawal of Reverend William Foster and about sixty members from the St. James A.M.E. Church, which is also listed on the National Register. The Union Bethel A.M.E. church was incorporated in 1903, and its building foundation and basement were built in 1910-11; it is believed this was entirely incorporated in the present church, designed by architect Emile Weil, erected in 1921.

== History ==
Like the Connectional African Methodist Episcopal Church Union Bethel was born out of sociological differences. In 1862 a small band of sixty (60) dissatisfied Christians led by a local preacher, Rev. William Foster, withdrew from St. James AME Church under a "sort of social and religious struggle between free mulattos and free blacks. The first place was located at Camp and Clio Streets and they called it "Bethel," meaning "God is in this house."

Between 1866 and 1883, eleven pastors served and the membership fluctuated as they worshipped in several places. In 1883, the congregation purchased the lot at Thalia and South Liberty Streets, the present location. They built a wooden structure which served as both a church and a school. In 1903 the church was officially incorporated under the name of Union Bethel African Methodist Episcopal Church of New Orleans. In 1906 this building burned to the ground.

The foundation for the present church was laid in 1910 and the cornerstone is dated June 18, 1911. The upper level of the building was completed in 1921. The Rev. William A. McClendon BD. was the Pastor in 1926. He was responsible for raising significant funds for the church. In 1929 a building located at 1323 South Liberty Street was purchased and served as the first parsonage. During this period of growth, building and expansion Reverends Green B. Billops, W. A. Easton and J. B. Bell served as pastors.

It was in 1941 that Bishop Sherman Lawrence Greene appointed Reverend Howard Thomas Primm pastor of Union Bethel. He served as pastor from 1941–1952. This was a period of great growth and expansion. Union Bethel became known as the seven day a week church During his pastorate at Union Bethel Reverend Primm established the Sarah Allen Child Development Center, This program set the pattern for Child Care across the City of New Orleans and later throughout the AME Church Connection. The Center was self-sustaining and received no funding from outside sources. In addition, he established the Edythe M. Primm Well Baby Clinic which employed a physician, two registered nurses, one student nurse and one clerk and the Primrose New-Life Building.

At the General Conference of 1952 Reverend Primm was elevated to the Episcopacy of the AME Church.

The Reverend George Napoleon Collins was assigned to Union Bethel following Bishop Primm. He worked with the congregation to organize and build St. Matthew A.M.E. Church in Ponchatoula, Louisiana. He organized the Foreign Aid Board which gave support to the overseas districts. Rev. Collins was elevated to position of Presiding Elder and then to the Episcopacy of the AME Church.

During the pastorate of Rev. T. W. Gaines, the congregation installed stained-glass windows. Gaines also provided pastoral care to sick and homebound members.

During the administration of The Reverend Lutrelle Grice Long, renowned preacher, Dr. Martin Luther King, Jr. made his second proclamation against segregation and the use of public facilities when he was denied use of the Municipal Auditorium of New Orleans. Rev. Long opened the doors of Union Bethel to Dr. King. It was during this period during the height of civil rights movement numerous activities took place at Union Bethel. It was under his leadership the church was restored after having endured a horrific fire that gutted the building in 1962 and was restored in the fall of 1963.

The Reverend Nelson Pryor Patterson brought with him an emphasis on following the Discipline of the AME Church. He displayed a concern for others and inspired a new spirit of cooperation within the "family". As a result, Bro. Sidney Collier initiated the Celestial Drive which to the liquidation of the indebtedness of the church and parsonage.

During the administration of the Reverend Lorenzo G. Clarke the fellowship hall and the main sanctuary were renovated. He emphasized the development of the Youth Department, organized the Cathedral Choir and initiated the 8 am worship service.

November 1982 Bishop Frank Curtis Cummings assigned the Reverend Thomas Benjamin Brown, Jr. as pastor of Union Bethel. This esteemed proclaimer of the Word served Union Bethel as pastor over thirty years. The Union Bethel Community Development Corporation was established by Rev. Brown in an effort to better serve the surrounding community in a larger capacity. Among the programs established: Homeless Prevention (Rental and Utilities Assistance), Feeding the Homeless, After School Tutoring, Youth Enhancement (YES), First Time Home Buyers Program, Adult Education (GED), Senior Citizens Program, Families in Transition from Welfare to Work and Mentoring Children of Prisoners. On January 15, 2004 President George W. Bush visited Union Bethel and commended Union Bethel for its service to the community. Shortly following the presidential visit Union Bethel was awarded a grant to fund the Mentoring of Children of Prisoners Program. September 9, 2007 Union Bethel was named to the National Register of Historic Places. On April 24, 2014 Senator Mary Landrieu announced Union Bethel received a grant from U.S. Government FEMA of $3.4 million to rebuild the Four Freedoms Building.
