= St. Peter's AME Church =

Historic church in Kentucky, United States

- St. Peters AME Church
- U.S. National Register of Historic Places
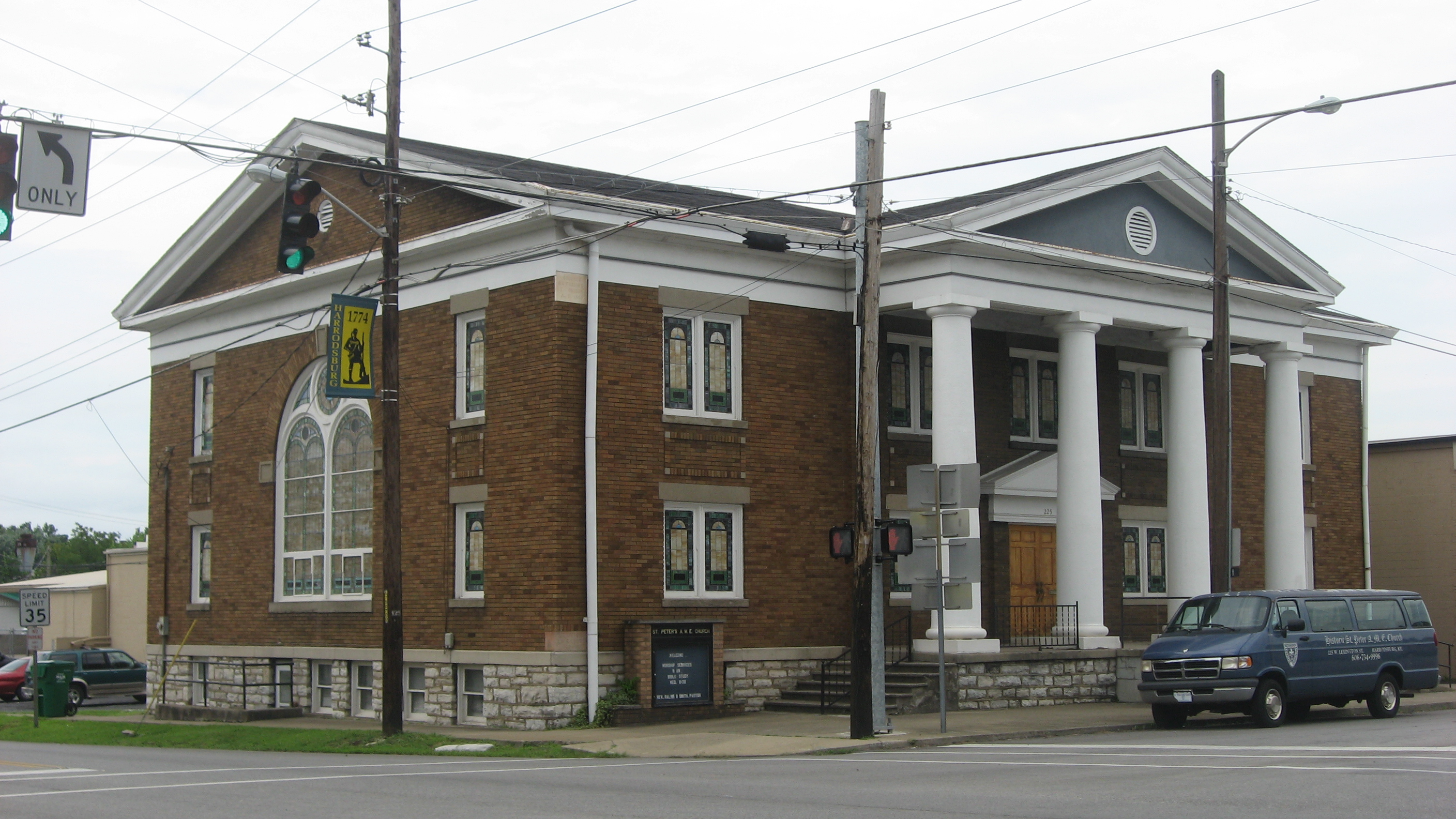

- Location within Kentucky Location within the United States
- Location: Lexington St. and US 127, Harrodsburg, Kentucky
- Coordinates: 37°45′45″N 84°50′41″W
- Area: 0.2 acres (0.081 ha)
- Built: 1917-18
- Architect: Sallee, George Jr.
- Architectural style: Classical Revival
- MPS: Mercer County MRA
- NRHP reference No.: 88003381
- Added to NRHP: February 9, 1989

The St. Peters AME Church in Harrodsburg, Kentucky, is a historic church at Lexington Street and US 127. It was added to the National Register of Historic Places in 1989.

It is an African Methodist Episcopal church. The congregation was founded in 1839. The present church was built by contractor George Sallee Jr., with work contributed by members of the congregation during 1917 to 1918.
