= Mount Zion A.M.E. Church (Ocala, Florida) =

Historic church in Florida, United States

- U.S. National Register of Historic Places
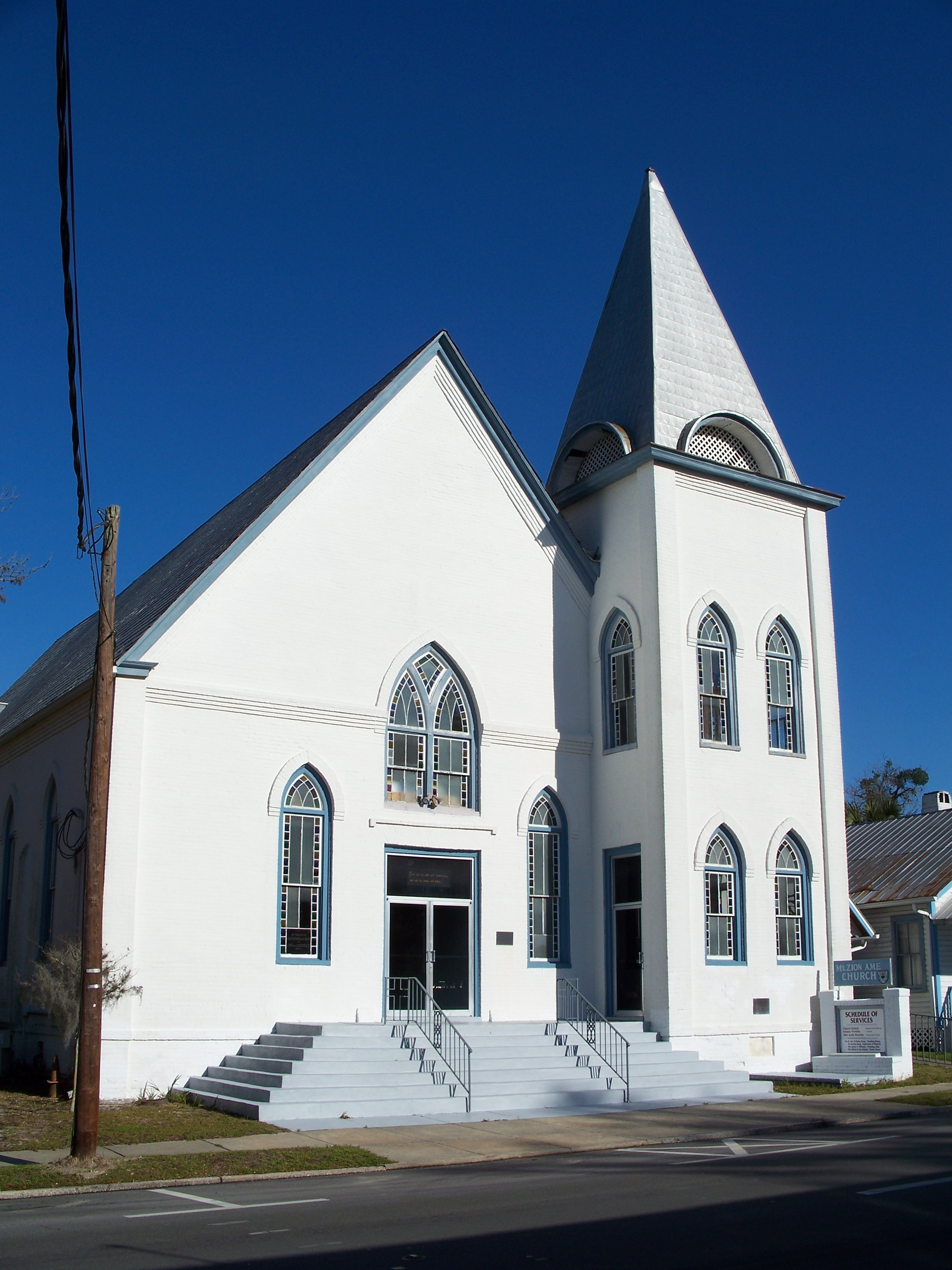

- Location within Florida Location within the United States
- Location: Ocala, Marion County, Florida, USA
- Coordinates: 29°10′52″N 82°8′13″W
- Built: 1891
- NRHP reference No.: 79000683
- Added to NRHP: December 17, 1979

The Mount Zion A.M.E. Church is a historic church in Ocala, Florida, United States. It is located at 623 South Magnolia Avenue. The only surviving brick 19th-century religious structure in Ocala, the present Gothic Revival church stands behind the site of the original white frame building. Construction of the first brick church owned by a black congregation began in 1891 under the supervision of black architect and builder Levi Alexander, Sr.

On December 17, 1979, it was added to the U.S. National Register of Historic Places.
