= Thomas Memorial AME Zion Church =

Historic church in New York, United States

- U.S. National Register of Historic Places
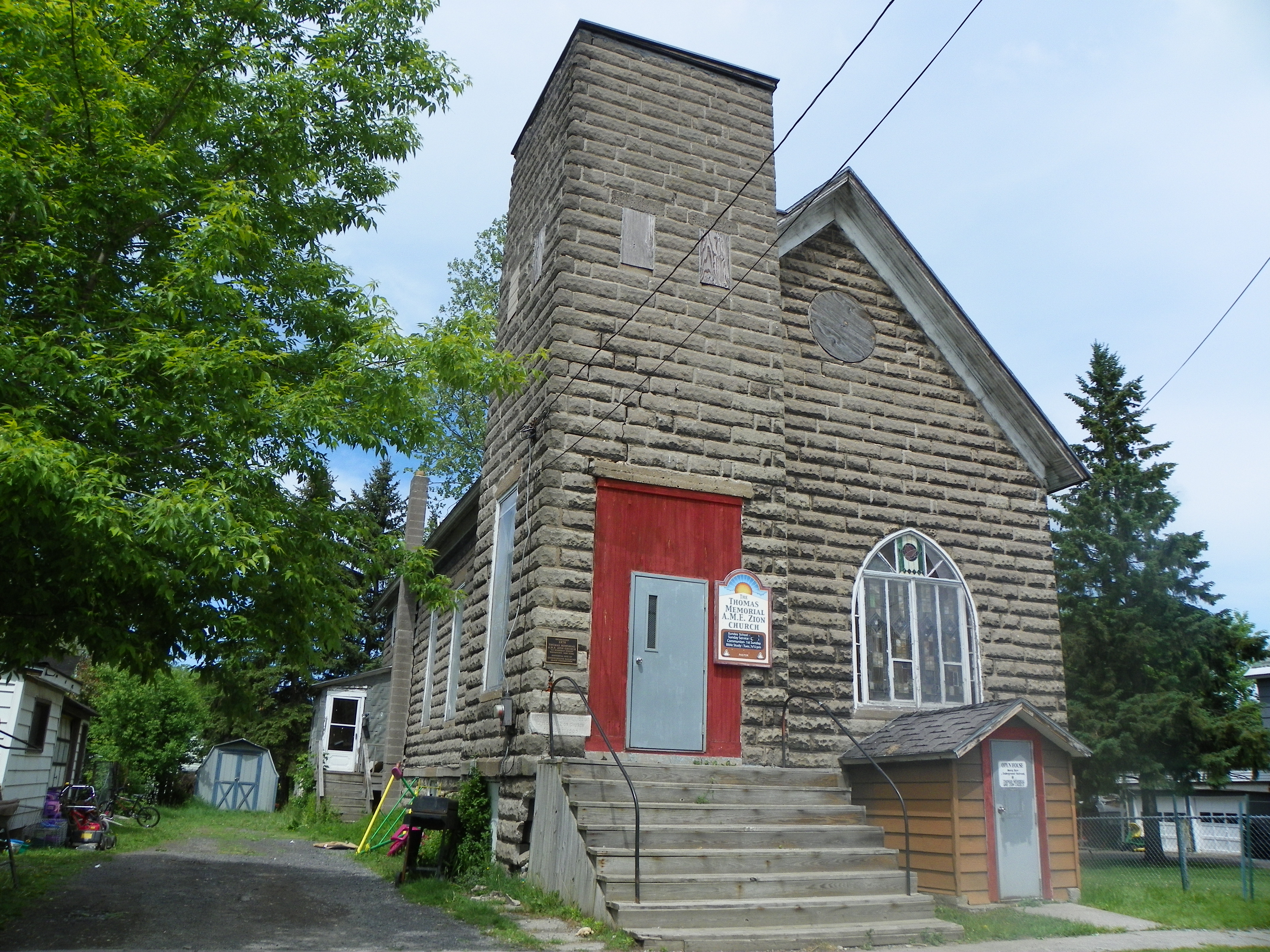
- Thomas Memorial AME Zion Church, May 2013

- Location within New York Location within the United States
- Location: 715 Morrison St., Watertown, New York
- Coordinates: 43°59′7″N 75°54′55″W
- Area: less than one acre
- Built: 1909
- Architectural style: Late Gothic Revival
- NRHP reference No.: 02000144
- Added to NRHP: March 06, 2002

Thomas Memorial AME Zion Church is a historic African Methodist Episcopal Zion church located at Watertown in Jefferson County, New York. It was built in 1909 and is a small front gabled vernacular building with minimal Gothic details. It is constructed of cast concrete blocks and features a plain square tower with no spire. Its also a place where the run away slaves would use as a hub for the under ground railroad, along with several houses on the street. It was listed on the National Register of Historic Places in 2002.
