= Saint Philip AME Church =

Coordinates: 33.7458°N 84.2899°W

- Saint Philip AME Church
- Location: Atlanta, Georgia, United States
- Denomination: African Methodist Episcopal Church
- Website: www.saintphilip.org

History
- Founded: 1875
- Founder: Rev. Browning

Architecture
- Years built: 1998

Specifications
- Capacity: 2500

Administration
- District: Sixth Episcopal District

Clergy
- Pastor: Rev. Dr. Anton G. Elwood

Saint Philip AME Church is located in Atlanta, Georgia, United States. It is the largest congregation in the Sixth Episcopal district of the African Methodist Episcopal Church, with over 5,000 members.

== History ==
Saint Philip AME Church began in 1875 on Renfroe St in Reynoldstown, a neighborhood in East Atlanta, under the leadership of Rev. Browning. A second edifice was erected on Oliver St (now known as Kenyon St). In 1922, another building was erected at the corner of Wylie St. and Selma St. This building still stands and is the home to another AME church.

In 1970, Rev. George A. Moore, Sr. became pastor at Saint Philip AME Church. In 1977, a group of trustees, under Pastor Moore's leadership, purchased a building at the corner of Candler Rd. and Memorial Dr. At this location, the church membership grew to over 10,000.

In 1998, also under the leadership of Pastor Moore, a new edifice was erected to accommodate 2,500 worshipers every Sunday at three services at 7:30am, 9:00am and 11:00am. The former sanctuary at the corner of Candler Rd. and Memorial Dr. is still used by the church on various occasions.

In May 2011, after serving as senior pastor at Saint Philip for four decades, Rev. George A. Moore, Sr. was retired by the AME denomination and Rev. William D. Watley, PhD was appointed as the new minister.

== See also ==
- Black church
