= Allen's Point, Texas =

Unincorporated community in Texas, US

Allen's Point
- Unincorporated community
- Location within Texas
- Coordinates: 33.6448254°N 95.9077468°W
- Country: United States
- State: Texas
- County: Fannin
- Named for: Wilson B. Allen
- Elevation: 640 ft (195 m)

Allen's Point, also Yew, is an unincorporated community in Fannin County, Texas, United States. Situated on Farm to Market Road 100, it was settled in 1836, by Tennessee-born settler Wilson B. Allen, who named the settlement after himself. A farming community, it is believed to house Fannin County's first Methodist and Baptist churches. A post office called Yew, after settler H. C. Yew, operated there from 1899 to 1903, with the name returning to Allen's Point afterward. In 1964, the community was awarded first place in a rural community contest, made by the Texas A&M AgriLife Extension Service. As of 1990 and 2000, its population is 76.
