= St. Peter's AME Zion Church =

Historic church in North Carolina, United States

- U.S. National Register of Historic Places
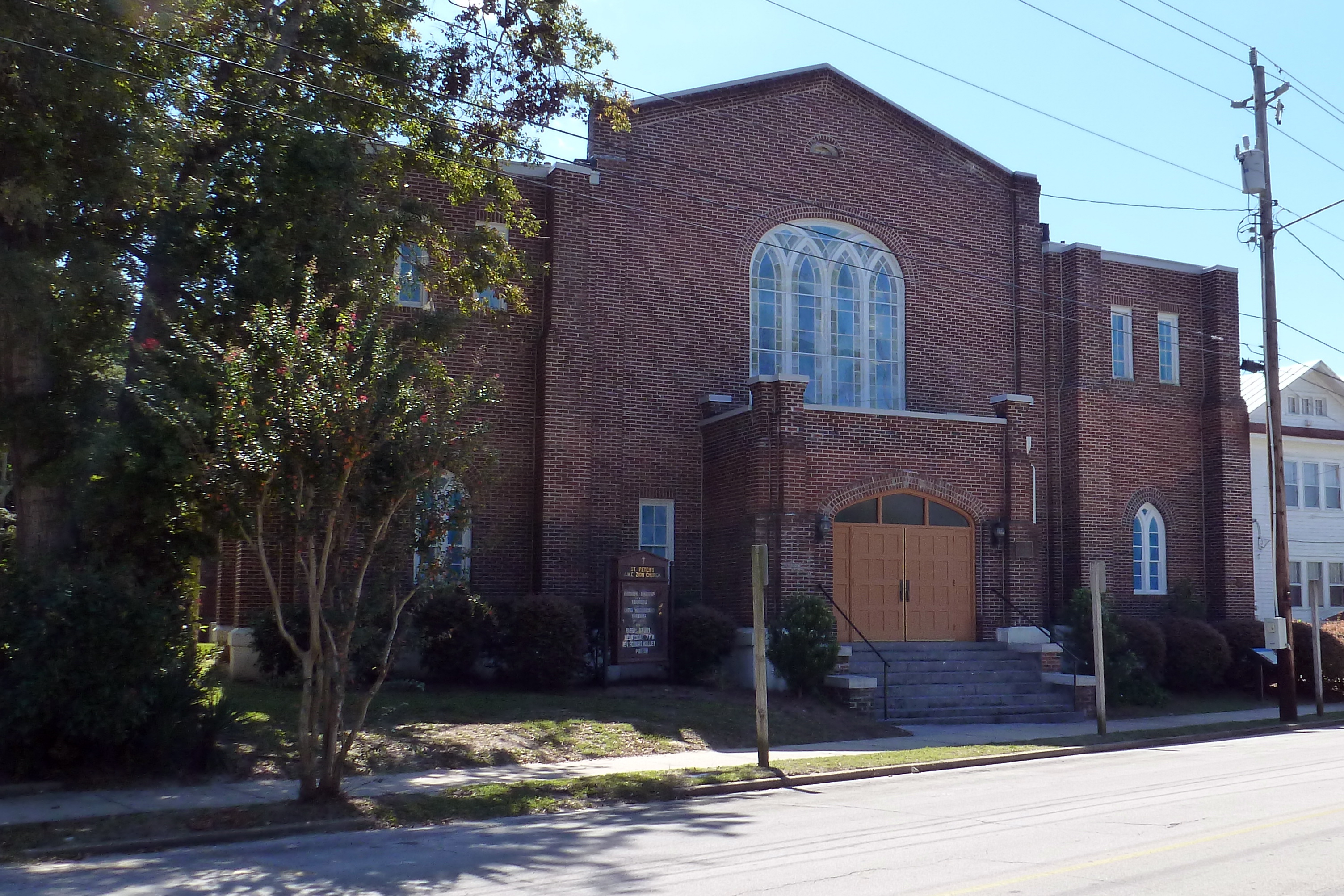

- Location within North Carolina Location within the United States
- Location: 615 Queen St., New Bern, North Carolina
- Coordinates: 35°6′37″N 77°2′37″W
- Area: less than one acre
- Built: 1923-1942, 1926
- Built by: Sparrow, Henry Clay
- Architectural style: Bungalow/Craftsman, Late Gothic Revival
- MPS: Historic African American Churches in Craven County MPS
- NRHP reference No.: 97000571
- Added to NRHP: June 30, 1997

St. Peter's AME Zion Church is a historic African Methodist Episcopal church located at 615 Queen Street in New Bern, Craven County, North Carolina. It was built between 1923 and 1942, on the site of the 1914 church building which was destroyed by fire in 1922. It is a large three bay by seven bay, rectangular brick church building in the Late Gothic Revival style. It features a gabled nave flanked by two-story truncated stair towers. Also on the property is the contributing 1926 parsonage; a 2 1/2-story, frame American Craftsman style dwelling. It is known within the denomination as the "Mother Church of Zion Methodism in the South," and the oldest existing African Methodist Episcopal congregation in the South.

It was listed on the National Register of Historic Places in 1997.
