= Ward Chapel AME Church =

Historic church in Oklahoma, United States

- U.S. National Register of Historic Places
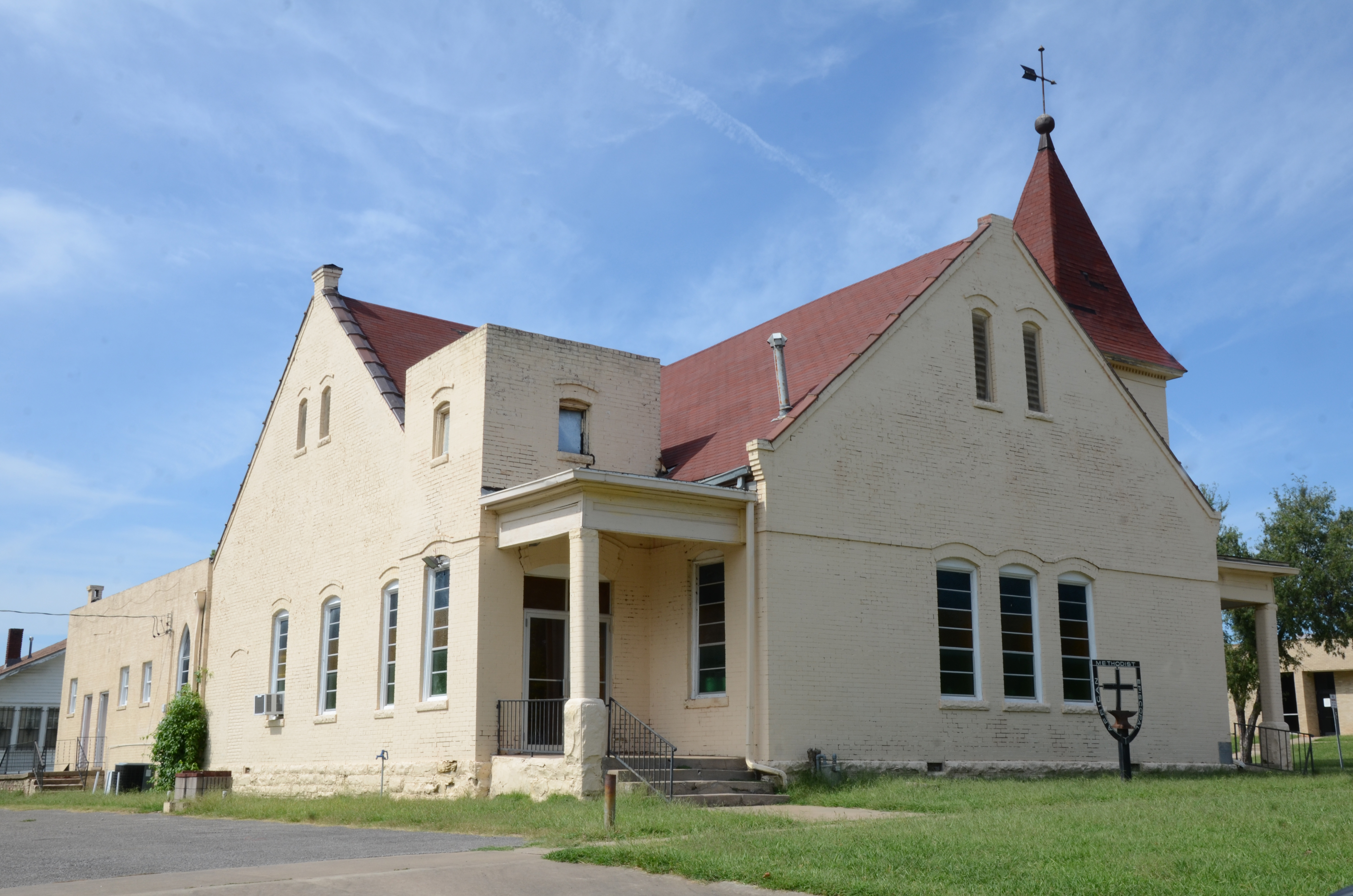

- Location within Oklahoma Location within the United States
- Location: 319 N. 9th St., Muskogee, Oklahoma
- Coordinates: 35°45′16″N 95°22′41″W
- Area: less than one acre
- Built: 1904
- MPS: Black Protestant Churches of Muskogee TR
- NRHP reference No.: 84003338
- Added to NRHP: September 25, 1984

The Ward Chapel AME Church is a historic African Methodist Episcopal Church building at 319 N. 9th Street in Muskogee, Oklahoma. It was built in 1904, three years before Oklahoma achieved statehood. It was added to the National Register in 1984.

It was deemed significant as "one of the oldest remaining social institutions in the black community of Muskogee"; it "is the oldest African Methodist Episcopal Church and the second oldest black Protestant church in Muskogee". It is a one-and-a-half-story 90 by 44 feet (27 m × 13 m) church, built of brick laid in running bond, painted yellow.

The Ward Chapel congregation was founded in 1883. The 1904 church building "was built in 1904 to accommodate the growing congregation and to serve the spiritual and social needs of Muskogee's black community which numbered over 7,000 at the time of construction."
