= St. Stephen's AME Church (Sandusky, Ohio) =

Historic church in Ohio, United States

- U.S. National Register of Historic Places
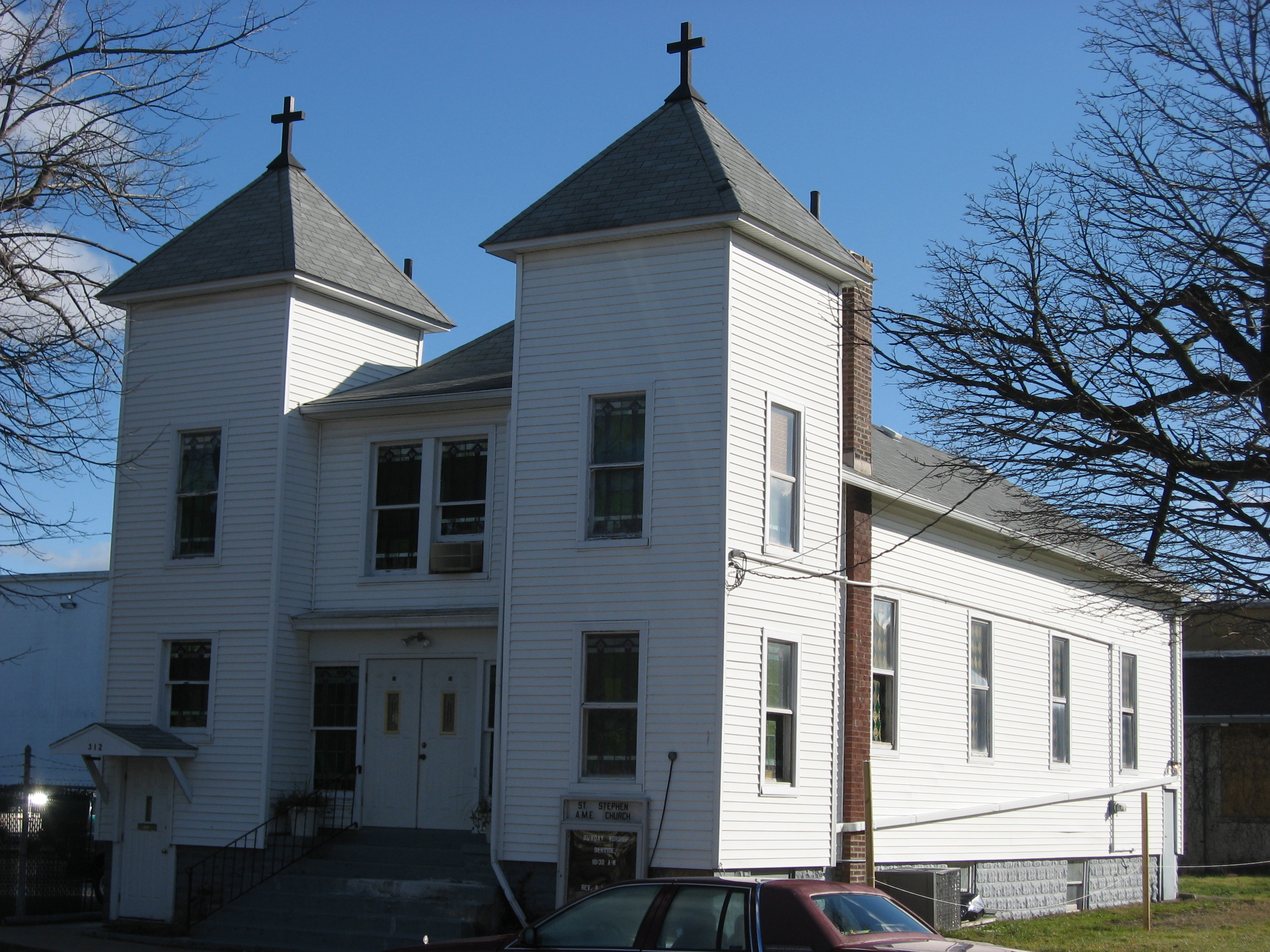
- Front and side of the church

- Location within Ohio Location within the United States
- Location: 312 Neil St., Sandusky, Ohio
- Coordinates: 41°26′56″N 82°42′11″W
- Area: Less than 1 acre (0.40 ha)
- Built: 1879
- MPS: Sandusky MRA
- NRHP reference No.: 82001441
- Added to NRHP: October 20, 1982

St. Stephen's AME Church is an historic African Methodist Episcopal Church building located at 312 Neil Street in Sandusky, Ohio, in the United States. On October 20, 1982, it was added to the National Register of Historic Places.

== Current use ==
St. Stephen's is still an active AME Church. Its current pastor is the Rev. Barbara J. Huston

== See also ==
- List of Registered Historic Places in Erie County, Ohio
