= St. Peter African Methodist Church =

Historic church in Tennessee, United States

- U.S. National Register of Historic Places
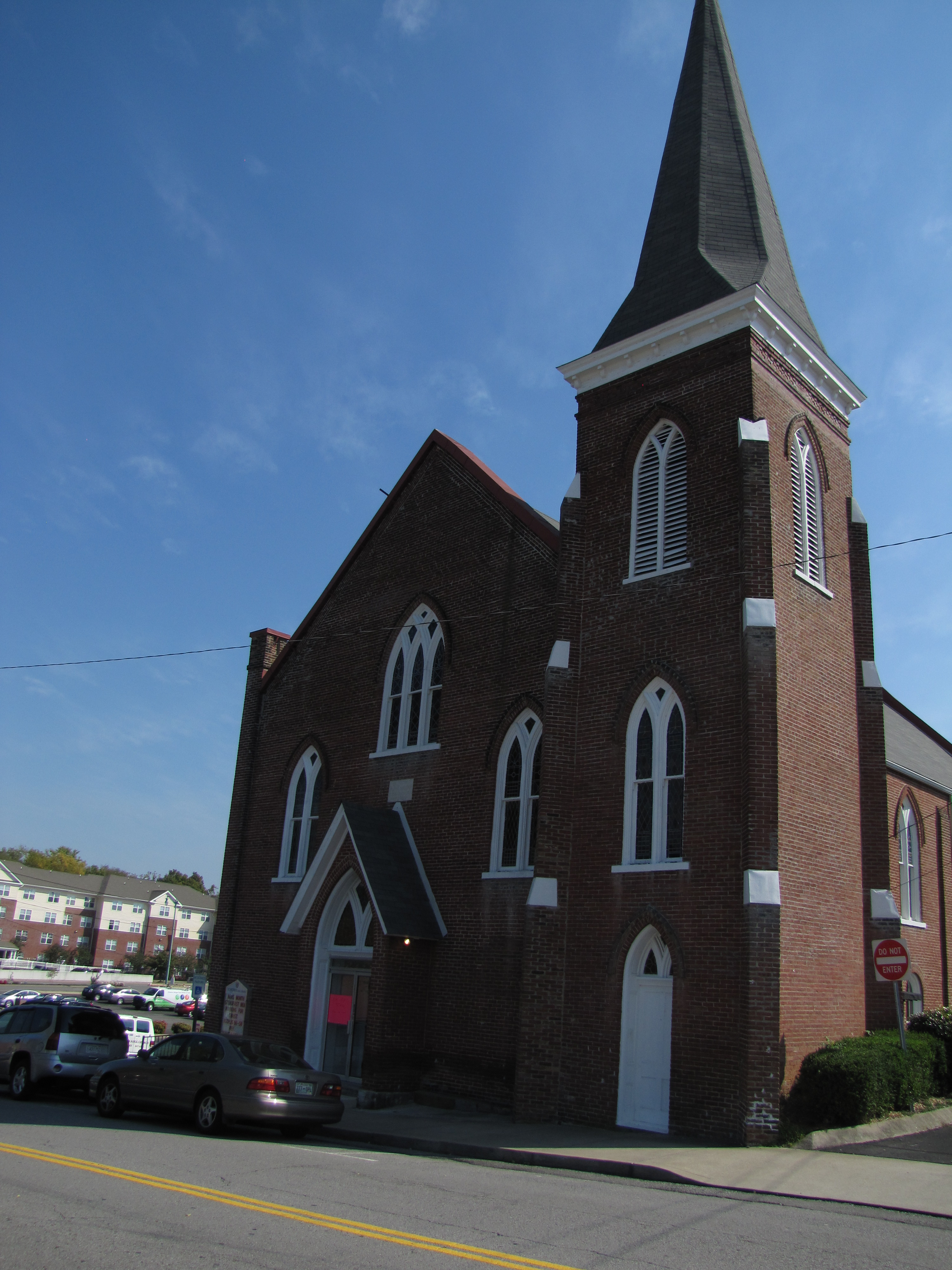

- Location within Tennessee Location within the United States
- Location: 518 Franklin St., Clarksville, Tennessee
- Coordinates: 36°31′42″N 87°21′14″W
- Area: 1.5 acres (0.61 ha)
- Built: 1873
- Architectural style: Gothic Revival
- MPS: Nineteenth Century Churches in Clarksville TR
- NRHP reference No.: 82004034
- Added to NRHP: April 6, 1982

St. Peter African Methodist Church is a historic church at 518 Franklin Street in Clarksville, Tennessee, United States. The Gothic Revival church building was constructed in 1873 and added to the National Register of Historic Places in 1982.
