= Mount Olive African Methodist Episcopal Church =

Historic church in Florida, United States

- U.S. National Register of Historic Places
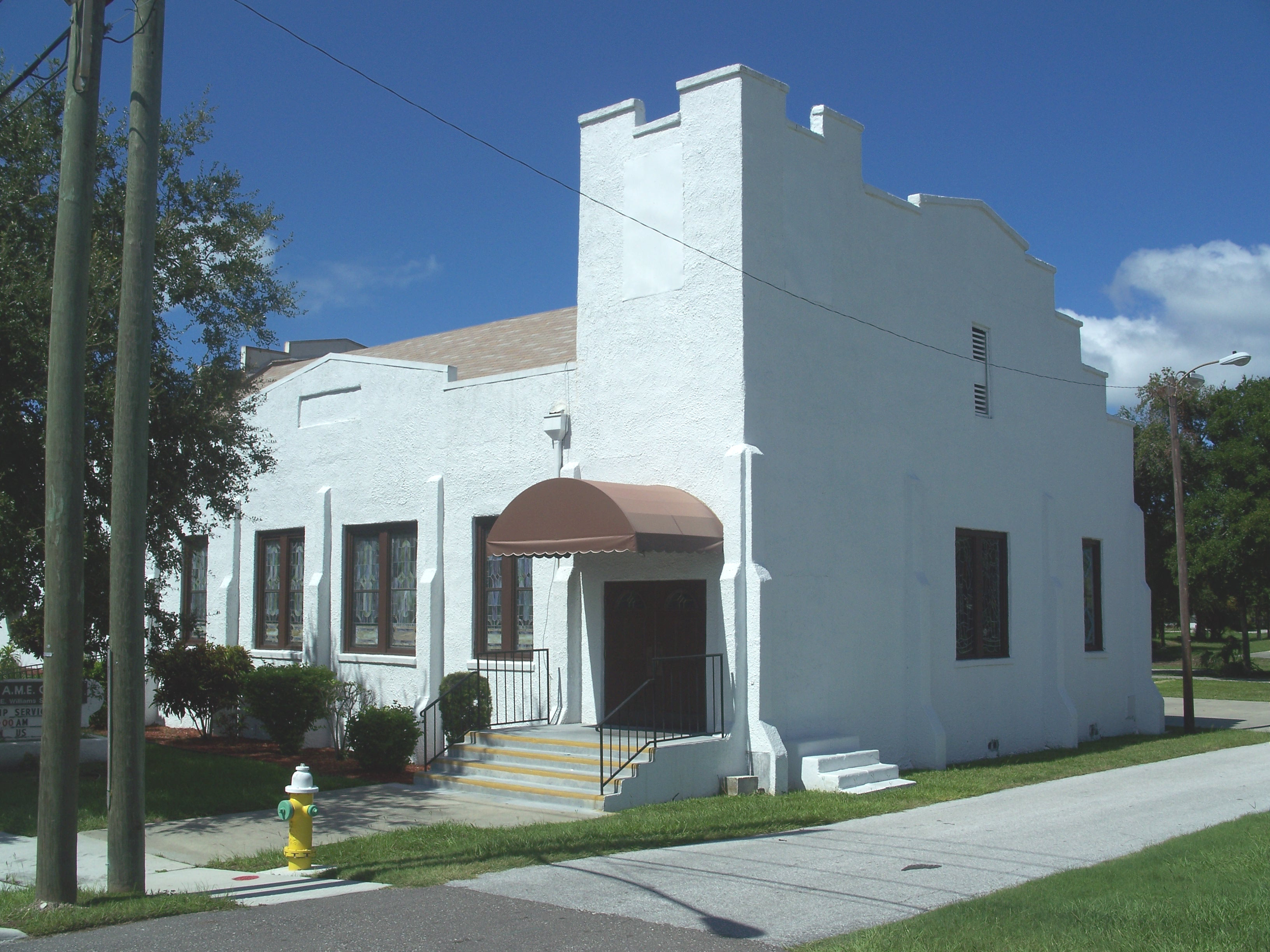
- Church facades and entrance tower

- Location within Florida Location within the United States
- Location: Clearwater, Florida
- Coordinates: 27°58′8″N 82°47′54″W
- NRHP reference No.: 99000802
- Added to NRHP: February 3, 2000

The Mount Olive African Methodist Episcopal Church (also known as the Hope Henry AME Church) is a historic church in Clearwater, Pinellas County, Florida.

It is located at 600 Jones Street.

On February 3, 2000, it was added to the U.S. National Register of Historic Places.

== See also ==
- African Methodist Episcopal Church
