= Allen Chapel A.M.E. Church (Murfreesboro, Tennessee) =

Historic church in Tennessee, United States

- U.S. National Register of Historic Places
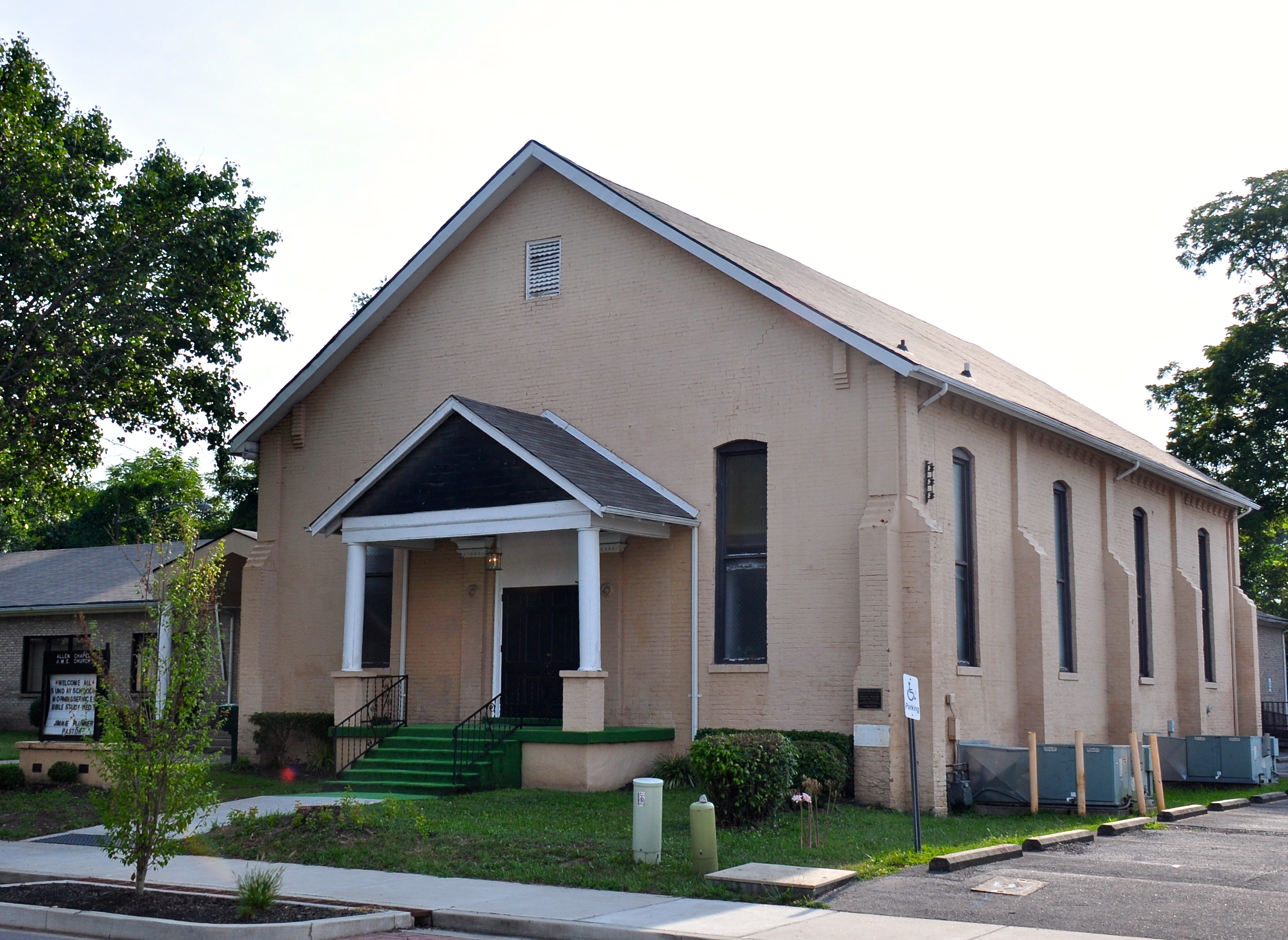
- Allen Chapel A.M.E. Church, August 2014.

- Location within Tennessee Location within the United States
- Location: 224 S. Maney Ave., Murfreesboro, Tennessee
- Coordinates: 35°50′38″N 86°23′14″W
- Area: less than one acre
- Built: 1889
- Built by: Dave Hyde; John, Oliver, and Horace Scruggs
- Architectural style: Gable-end, Gothic Revival
- NRHP reference No.: 95000291
- Added to NRHP: March 31, 1995

The Allen Chapel A.M.E. Church in Murfreesboro, Tennessee is a historic African Methodist Episcopal church at 224 S. Maney Avenue. It was built in 1889 and added to the National Register in 1995.

It is a one-story brick building on a brick foundation. The congregation, established in 1866, is the oldest African-American congregation in Rutherford County.
