= Mount Vernon AME Church (Gamaliel, Kentucky) =

Historic church in Kentucky, United States

- Mount Vernon A.M.E. Church
- U.S. National Register of Historic Places
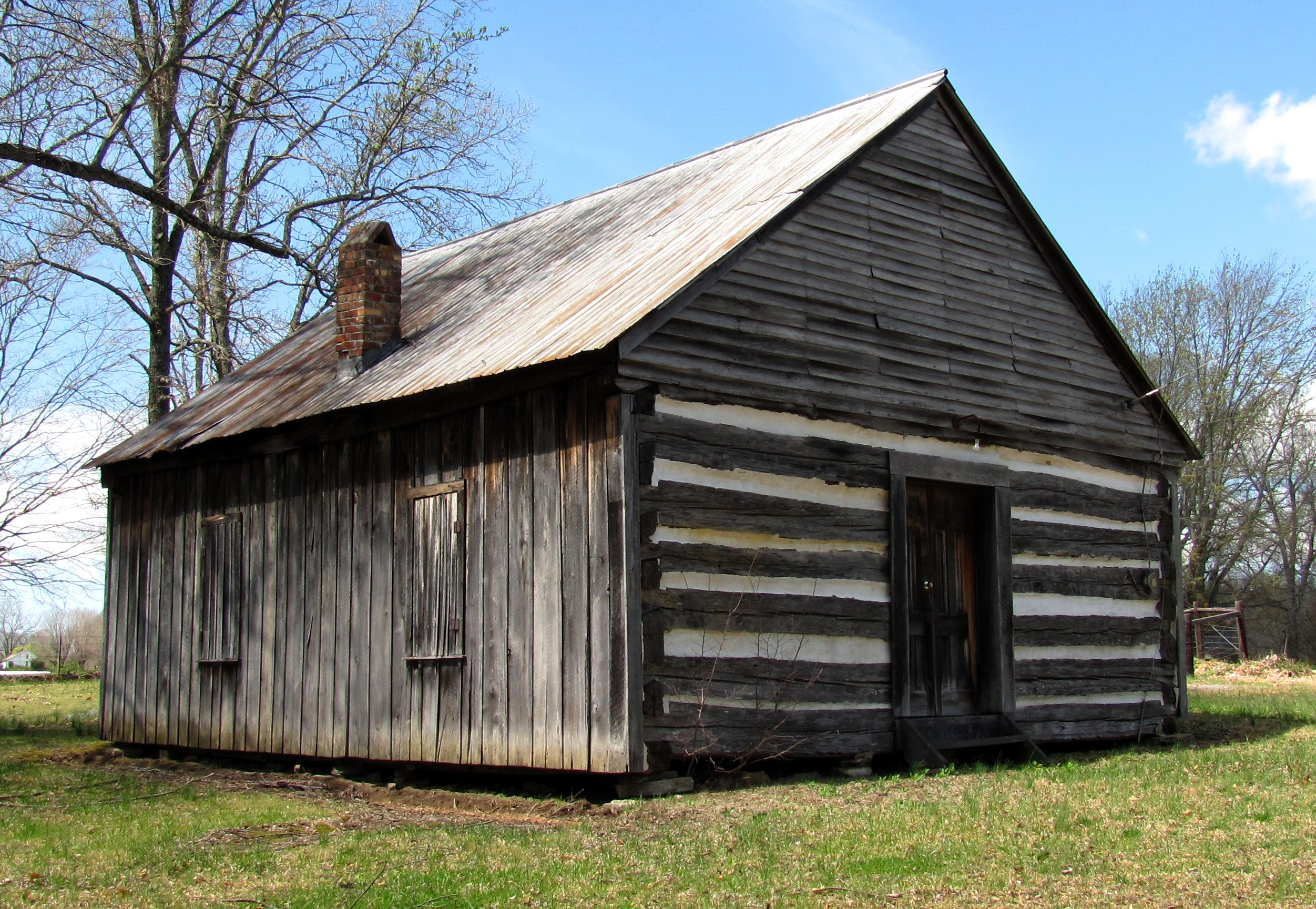

- Location within Kentucky Location within the United States
- Nearest city: Gamaliel, Kentucky
- Coordinates: 36°40′28″N 85°47′57″W
- Area: 0.5 acres (0.20 ha)
- Built: 1848
- Architect: Pipkin, George, et al.
- NRHP reference No.: 77000639
- Added to NRHP: November 17, 1977

Mount Vernon A.M.E. Church, also known as Mount Vernon African Methodist Episcopal Church, is a historic church located north of Gamaliel, Kentucky on Kentucky Route 100. It was added to the National Register of Historic Places in 1977.

It is a one-room one-story log structure built with dovetail notching. It was built by emancipated slaves in 1848. It was the first black church in Monroe County, and it served as a school as well.
