= St. Paul A.M.E. Church (Columbia, Missouri) =

Historic church in Missouri, United States

- St. Paul A.M.E Church
- U.S. National Register of Historic Places
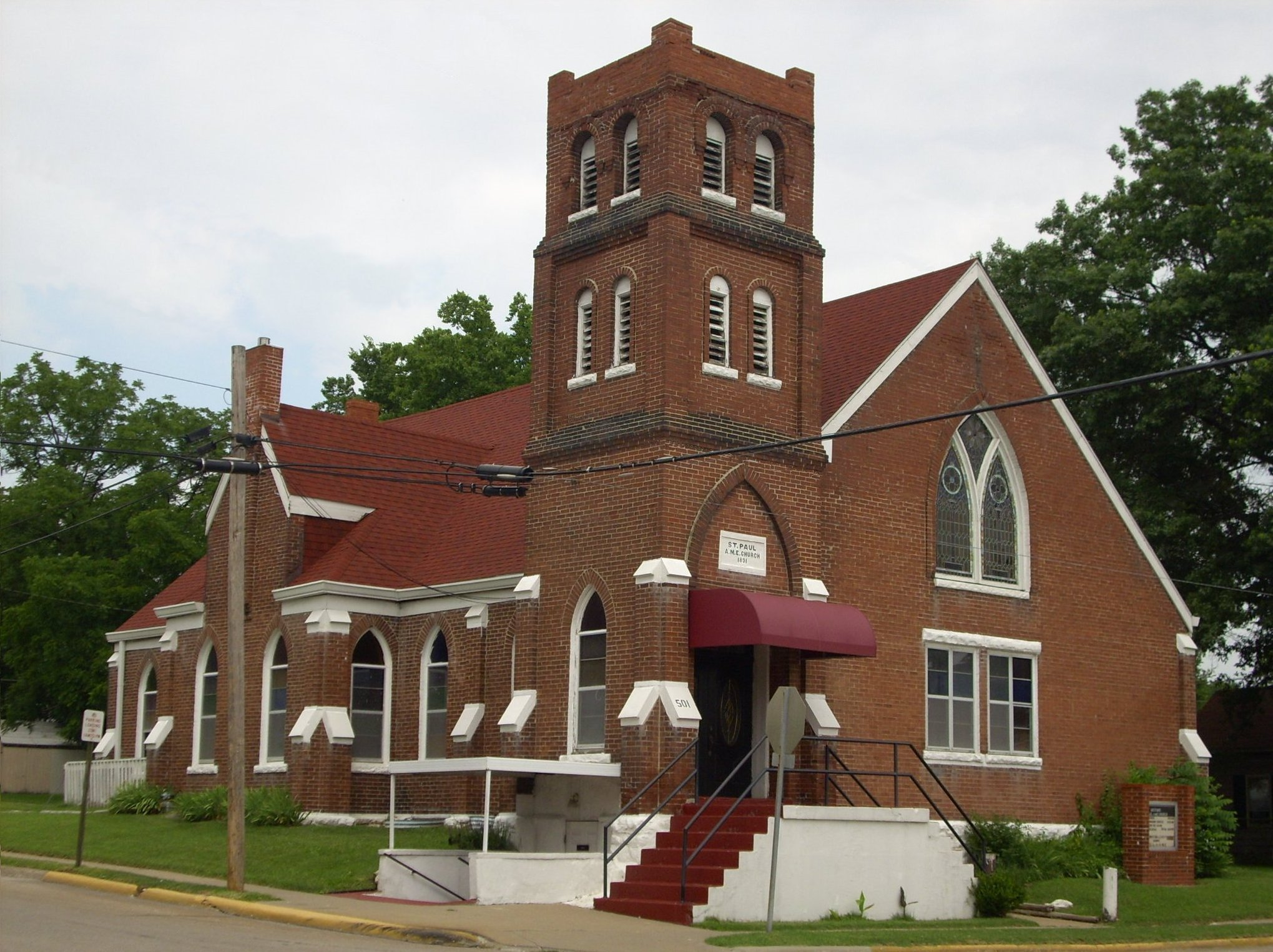

- Location within Missouri Location within the United States
- Location: 15th and Park Sts., Columbia, Missouri
- Coordinates: 38°57′17″N 92°19′53″W
- Area: less than one acre
- Built: 1891
- Architectural style: Gothic, Romanesque
- MPS: Social Institutions of Columbia's Black Community TR
- NRHP reference No.: 80002315
- Added to NRHP: September 4, 1980

St. Paul A.M.E. Church is a historic African Methodist Episcopal church located at Park Ave and N. 5th St. in Columbia, Missouri. It was built in 1891, and has Gothic Revival and Romanesque Revival design elements.

It was added to the National Register of Historic Places in 1980.

== Bibliography ==
- Heermance, J. Noel (1988). The History of St. Paul A.M.E. Church Columbia, Missouri 1867-1900. Columbia, Missouri: Unicorn Press. OCLC 623229147.
