= Allen Temple A.M.E. Church (Greenville, South Carolina) =

Historic church in South Carolina, United States

- U.S. National Register of Historic Places
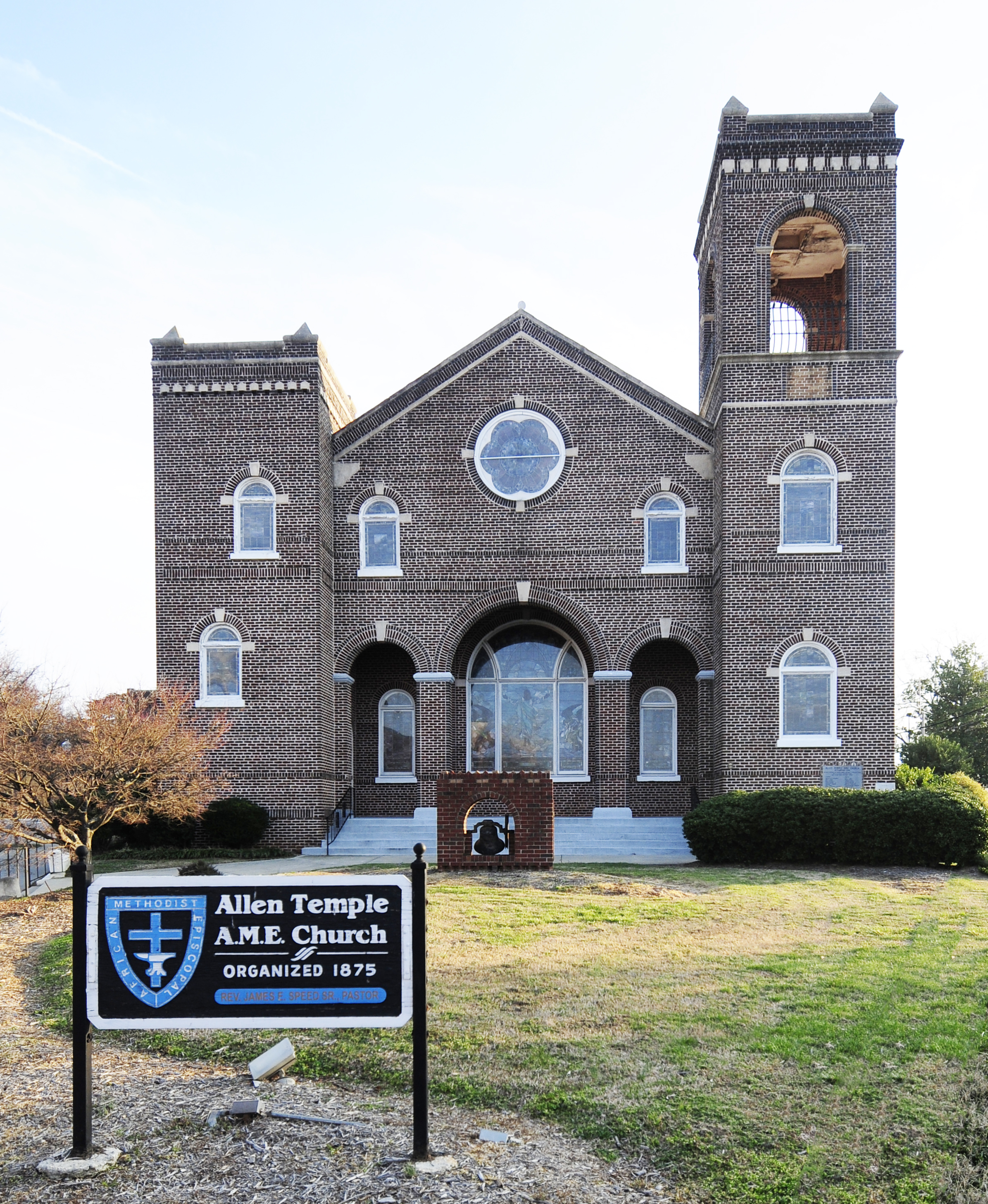

- Location within South Carolina Location within the United States
- Location: 109 Green Ave at jct. with S. Markley St., Greenville, South Carolina
- Coordinates: 34°50′29″N 82°24′33″W
- Area: less than one acre
- Built: 1929
- Architect: Molina, Juan Benito
- Architectural style: Classical Revival
- NRHP reference No.: 08000748
- Added to NRHP: June 18, 2008

Allen Temple A.M.E. Church is a historic church at 109 Green Avenue at the junction with S. Markley Street in Greenville, South Carolina.

It was built in 1929 in a Classical Revival style and was added to the National Register of Historic Places in 2008.
