= St. Paul's African Methodist Episcopal Church (Urbana, Ohio) =

Historic church in Ohio, United States

- St. Paul AME Church
- U.S. National Register of Historic Places
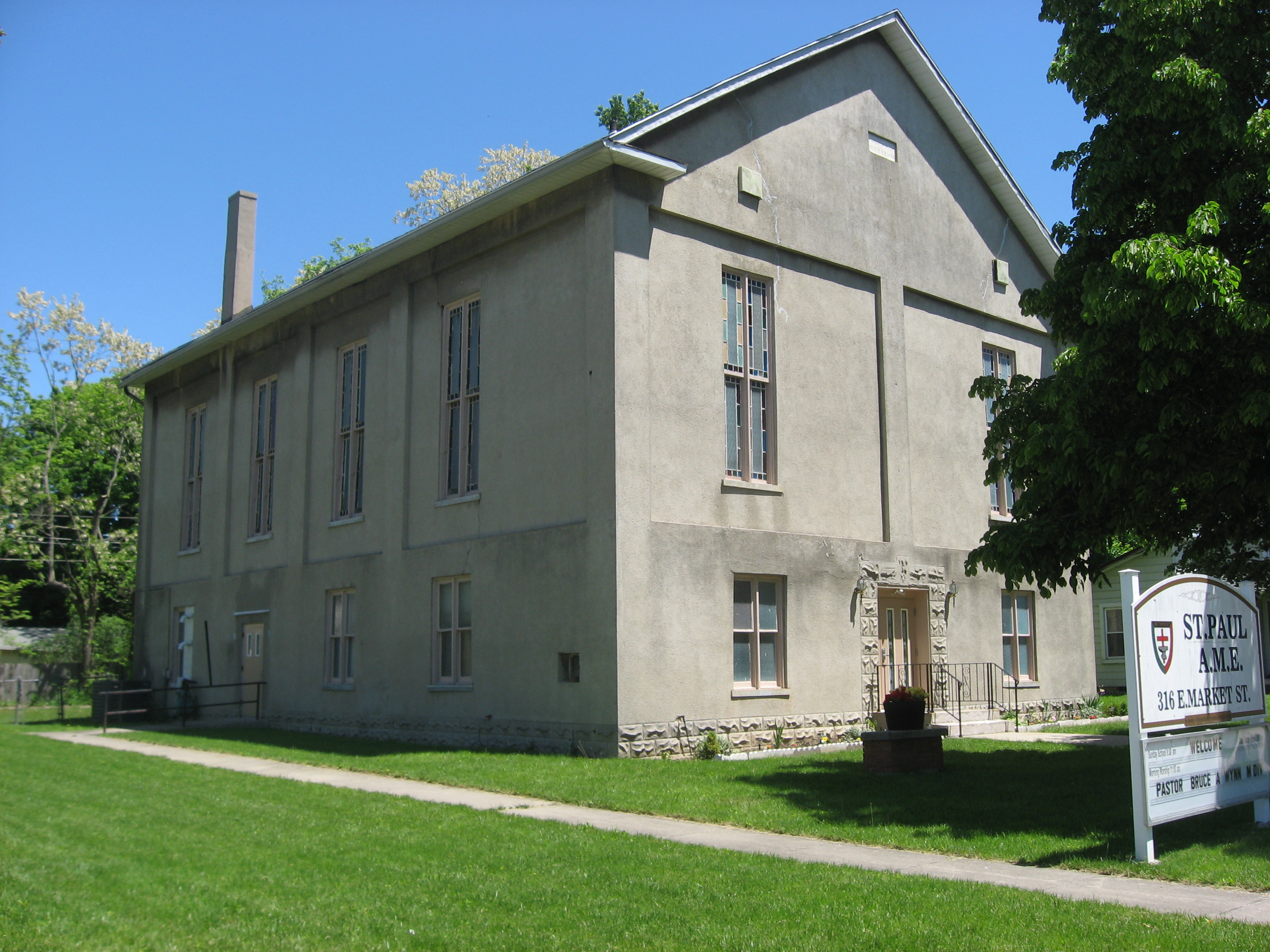
- Front and side of the church

- Location within Ohio Location within the United States
- Location: 316 E. Market St., Urbana, Ohio
- Coordinates: 40°6′25″N 83°44′56″W
- Area: less than one acre
- Built: 1876
- Architectural style: Greek Revival, Mid 19th Century Revival
- NRHP reference No.: 97000954
- Added to NRHP: September 5, 1997

St. Paul's African Methodist Episcopal Church is a historic church in Urbana, Ohio, United States. Built in the Greek Revival style in 1876, it is home to a congregation that was founded in the mid-1820s.

== Congregational history ==
Among Urbana's first black residents were a few individuals that had been members of African Methodist Episcopal (A.M.E.) churches in the East. In 1824 or 1825, A.M.E. missionary Moses Freeman visited Urbana while travelling through the then-western part of the United States; here he met the former members of his denomination and officially organized them as a congregation. Eight individuals composed the charter membership. In the earliest years, members worshipped in each other's homes, as finances were insufficient to build a house of worship.

Once the church was strong enough to erect a building, they built a small log structure. Growth soon caused this church to become too small for the number of worshippers; it was destroyed in 1844 and a larger brick church erected in its place by the members of the congregation. In turn, this church also became too small, and the members began to build a replacement in 1866.

Among the church's leading ministers have been Jerry Thompson and Benjamin W. Arnett. Although illiterate, Thompson was a powerful preacher who was known for his fervent sermons; he pastored in the church's earliest years. Arnett took charge of the congregation in 1876. As well as serving at St. Paul's, he ministered at A.M.E. churches in Cincinnati, Columbus, and Toledo, but he became most prominent in the years after his pastorate in Urbana. While a state representative from Greene County in 1886, he pioneered efforts to repeal Ohio's black codes.

Today, St. Paul's continues as an active congregation of the A.M.E. Church.

== Church building ==
Construction of the present church building was a long process: work began in 1866, but the structure was not completed until after Benjamin Arnett's 1876 installation as the pastor. This house of worship is primarily a masonry structure: its foundation is brick, and its walls are built of brick covered with stucco. It is covered with an asphalt roof that rises to a gable, and many windows of multiple panes illuminate the interior.

In 1997, St. Paul's Church was listed on the National Register of Historic Places, both because of its contribution to local history and because of its historic architecture.
