= Campbell Chapel African Methodist Episcopal Church (Glasgow, Missouri) =

Historic church in Missouri, United States

- U.S. National Register of Historic Places
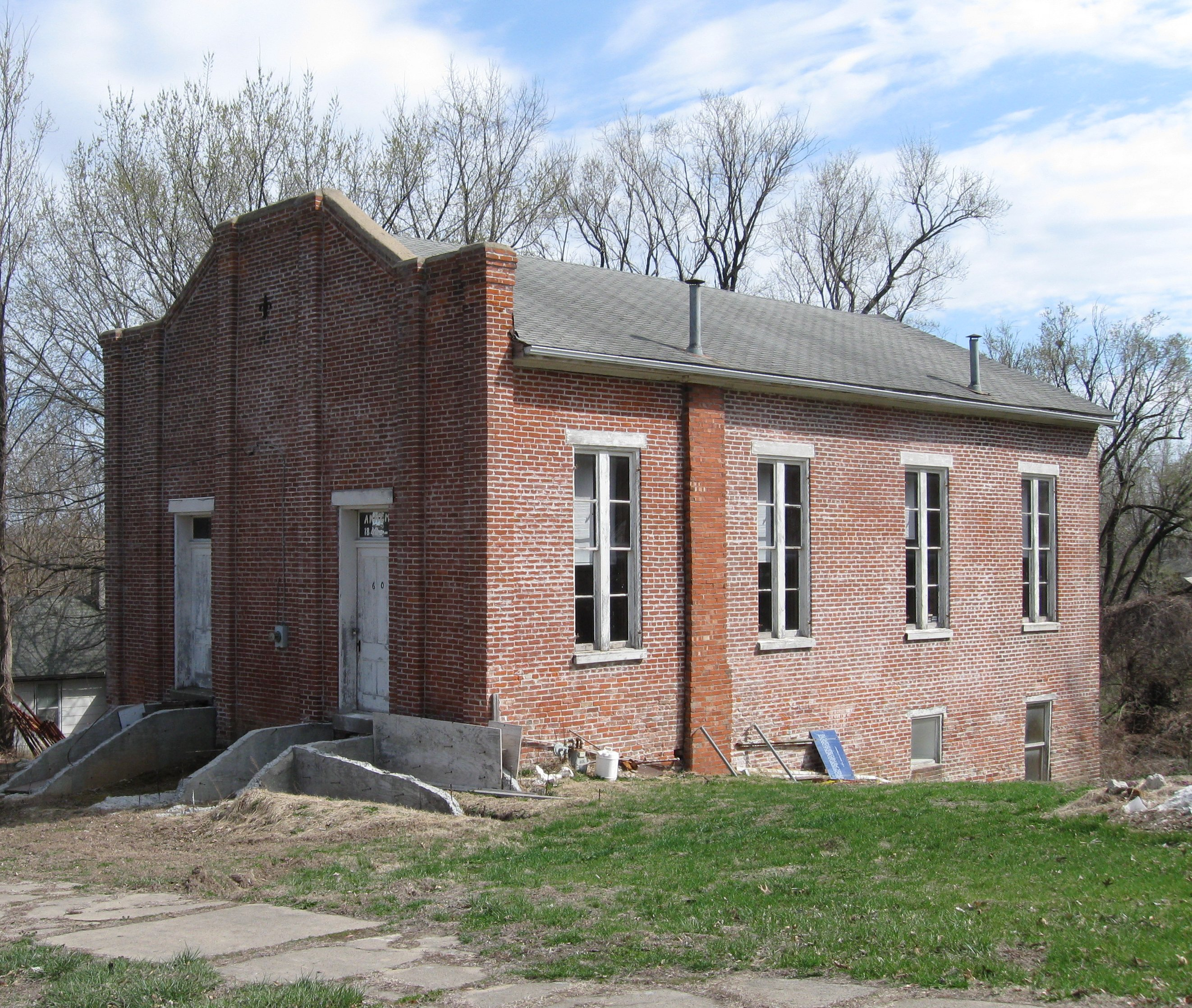

- Location within Missouri Location within the United States
- Location: 602 Commerce St., Glasgow, Missouri
- Coordinates: 39°13′36″N 92°50′29″W
- Area: less than one acre
- Built: 1865
- Built by: Moore, Corbin
- Architectural style: Greek Revival
- NRHP reference No.: 97001427
- Added to NRHP: November 13, 1997

Campbell Chapel African Methodist Episcopal Church is a historic African Methodist Episcopal church located at 602 Commerce Street in Glasgow, Howard County, Missouri. It was built in 1865, and is a small one-story, vernacular brick building with simple Greek Revival style design elements. The rectangular building measures 32 feet by 52 feet and features a stepped gable and six brick pilasters.

It was listed on the National Register of Historic Places in 1997.
