= St. James AME Church (Ashland, Kentucky) =

Historic church in Kentucky, United States

- U.S. National Register of Historic Places
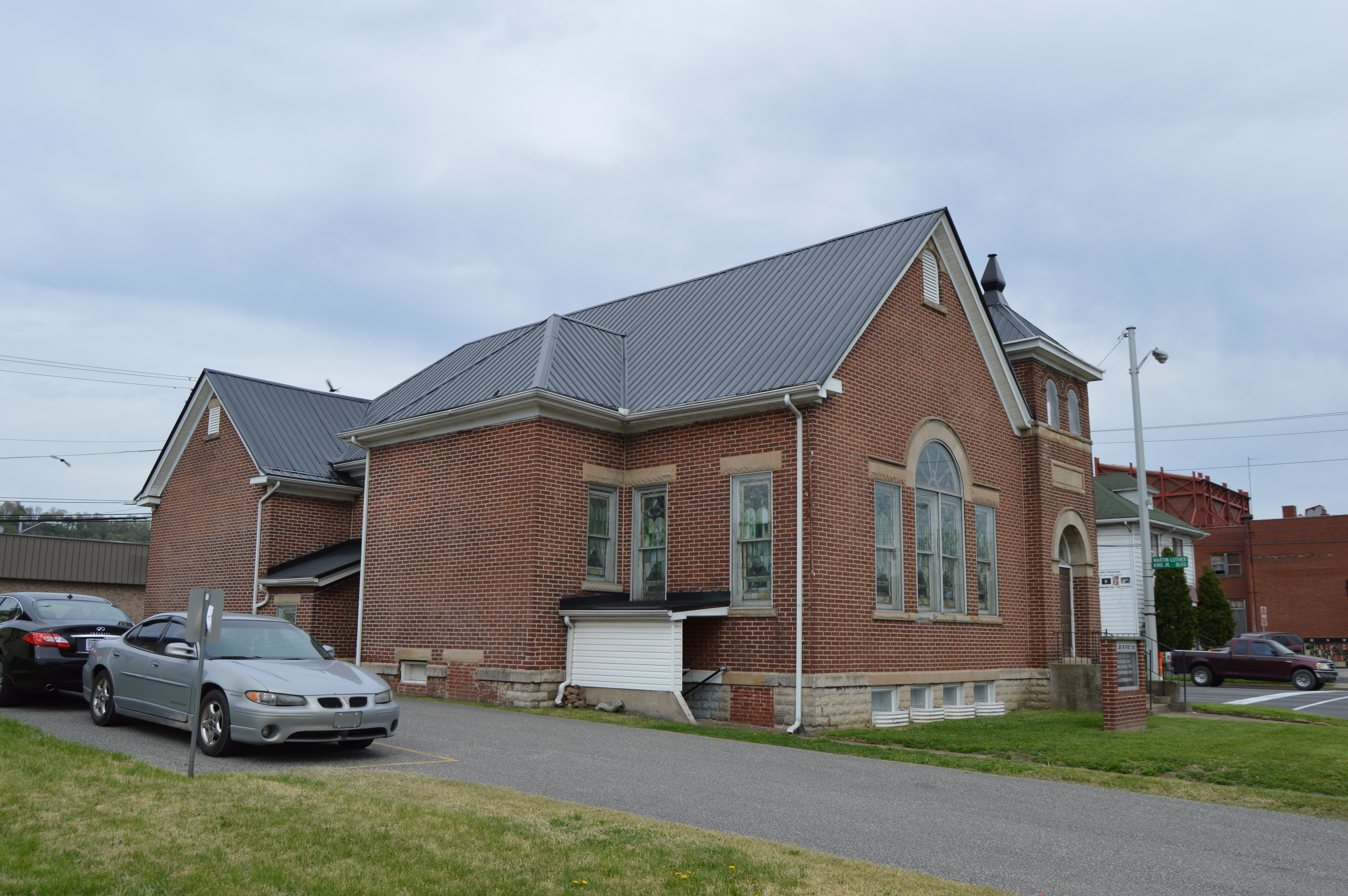
- Front of the church

- Location within Kentucky Location within the United States
- Location: 12th St. and Carter Ave., Ashland, Kentucky
- Coordinates: 38°28′48″N 82°38′41″W
- Built: 1912
- MPS: Ashland MRA
- NRHP reference No.: 79003555
- Added to NRHP: July 3, 1979

The St. James AME Church in Ashland, Kentucky is a historic African Methodist Episcopal church at 12th St. and Carter Avenue. It was built in 1912 and added to the National Register of Historic Places in 1979.

It is a gable-front brick building, with brick laid in common bond. It is the second church of the congregation: the first church was a wood-frame building which was moved in 1905 to the property, and which was eventually destroyed sometime after the brick building was built alongside.
