= St. James A. M. E. Church (Sanford, Florida) =

Historic church in Florida, United States

- U.S. National Register of Historic Places
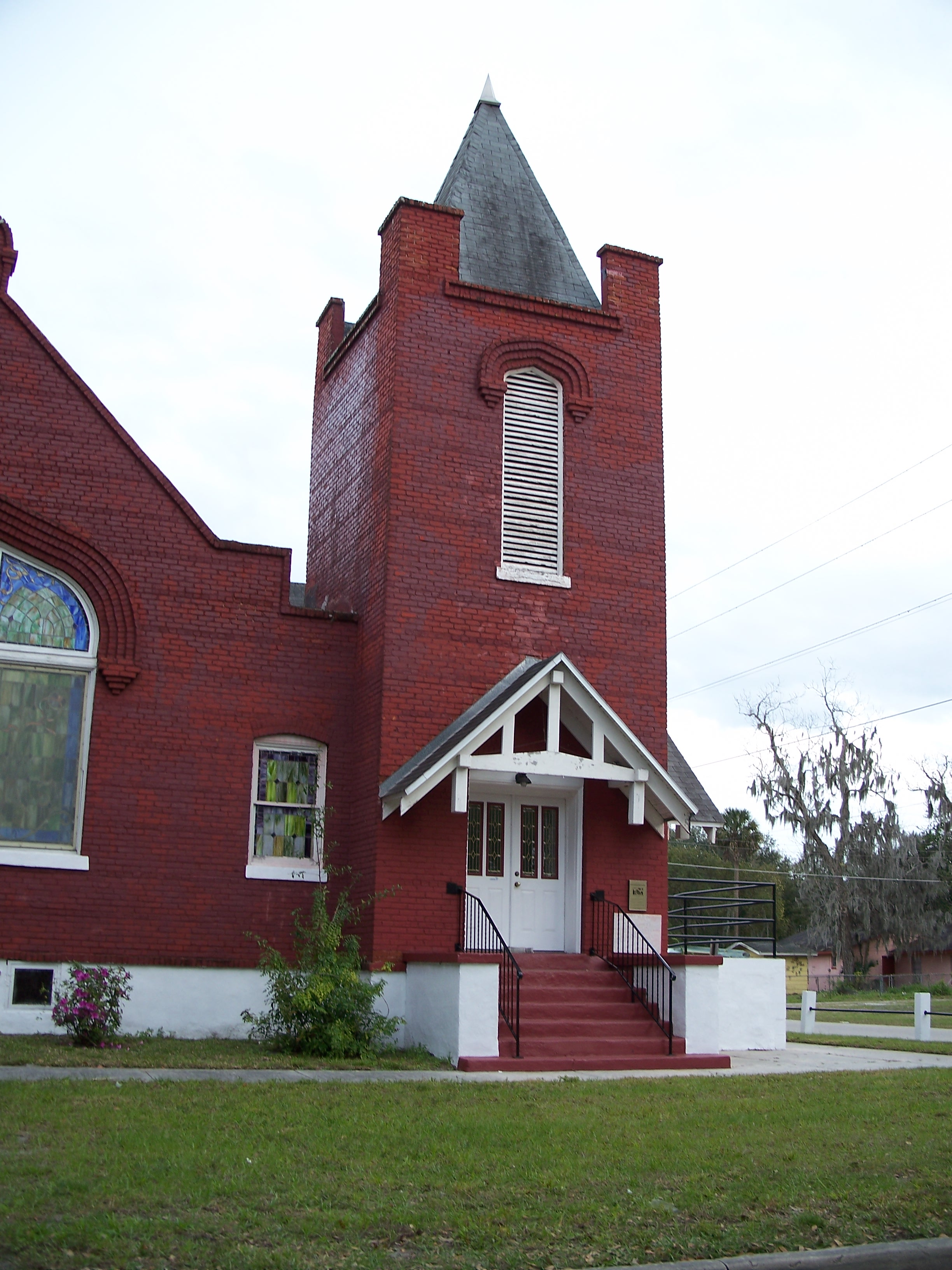

- Location within Florida Location within the United States
- Location: Sanford, Florida United States
- Coordinates: 28°48′16″N 81°15′50″W
- Built: 1913
- Architect: Prince W. Spears
- Architectural style: Gothic Revival, Other
- NRHP reference No.: 92000352
- Added to NRHP: April 24, 1992

St. James A. M. E. Church is a congregation of the African Methodist Episcopal Church in Sanford, Florida, United States. The oldest church in Sanford founded by African Americans, it was established in 1867, when the church purchased land on the corner of East Ninth Street and South Cypress Avenue.

The original church building was replaced in 1913 with a red brick Gothic Revival building designed by local architect Prince W. Spears.

In 1989, it was listed in A Guide to Florida's Historic Architecture prepared by the Florida Association of the American Institute of Architects and published by the University of Florida Press. On April 24, 1992, it was added to the U.S. National Register of Historic Places.

== Gallery ==
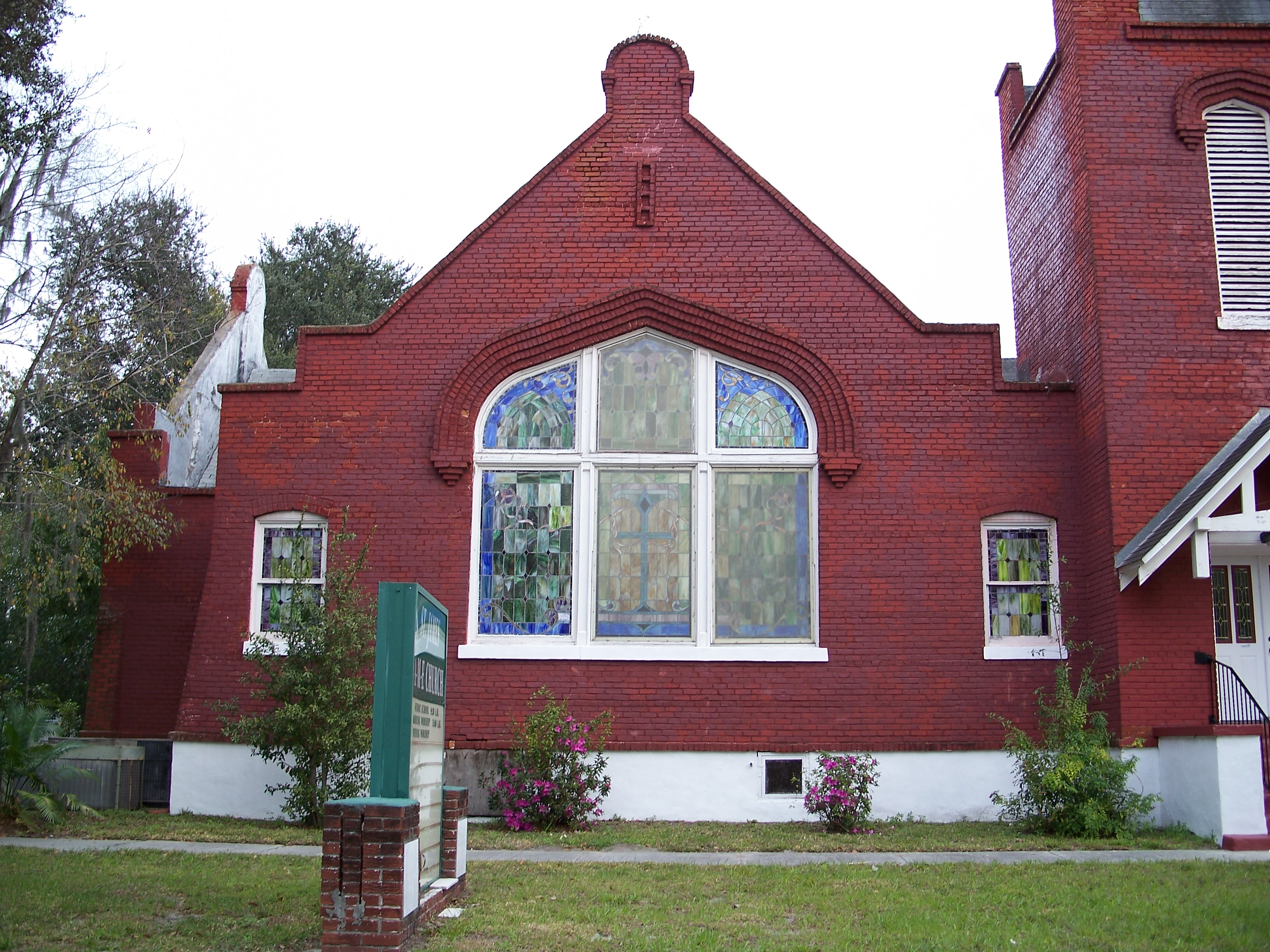

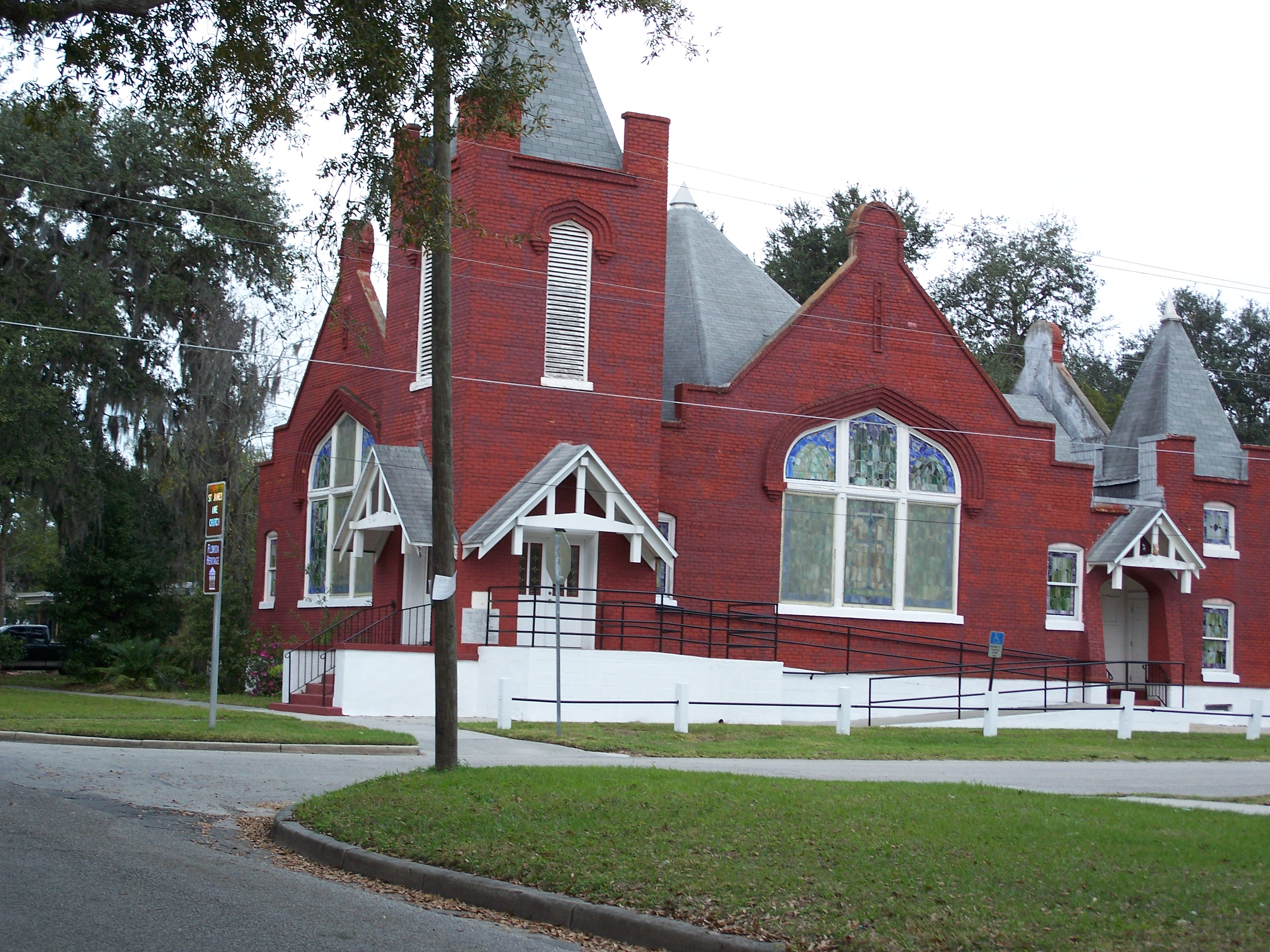
