= St. Paul African Methodist Episcopal Church (Fayetteville, Tennessee) =

Historic church in Tennessee, United States

- U.S. National Register of Historic Places
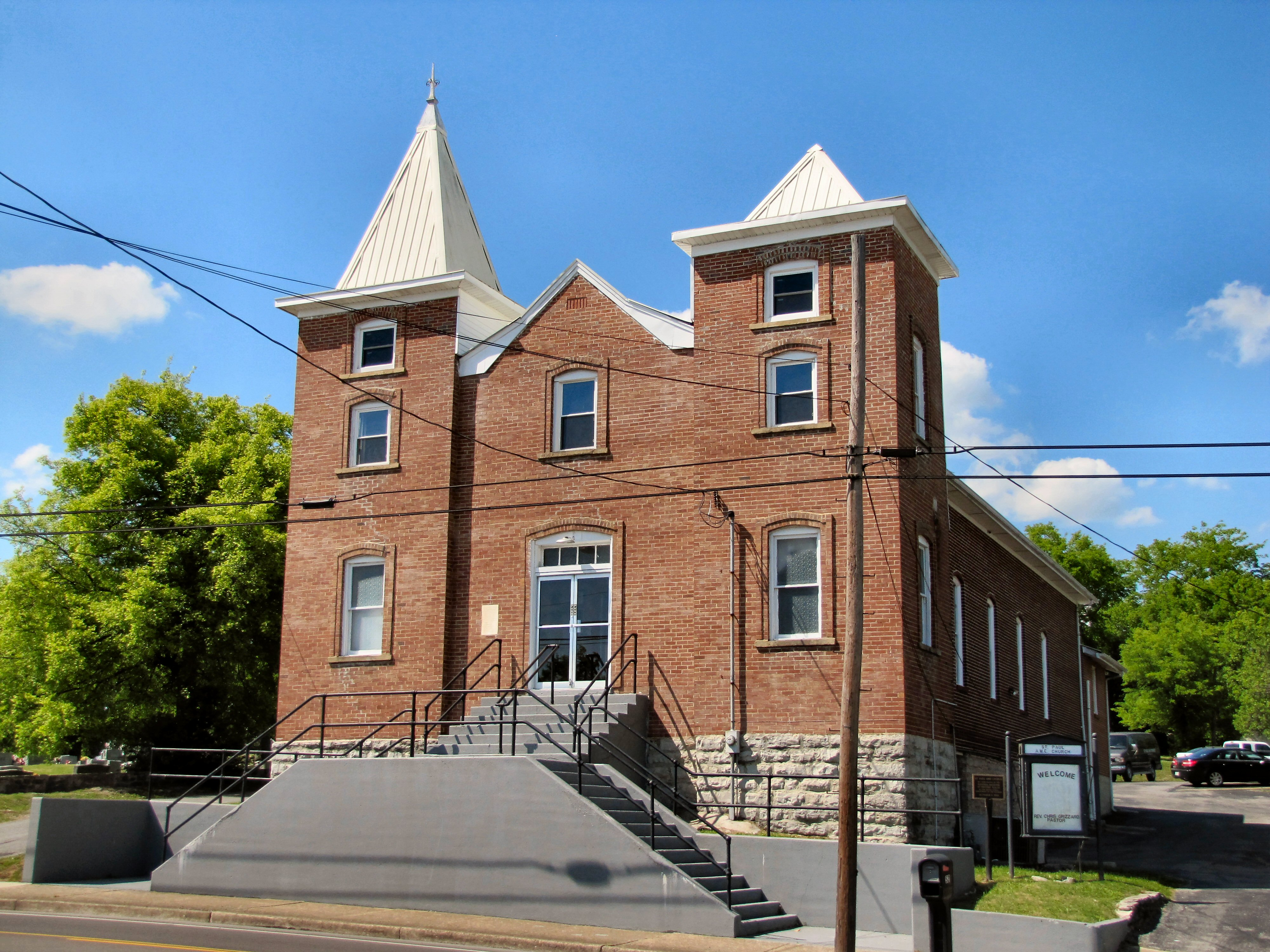

- Location within Tennessee Location within the United States
- Location: 521 W. College St., Fayetteville, Tennessee, U.S.
- Coordinates: 35°9′11″N 86°34′39″W
- Area: 1 acre (0.40 ha)
- Built: 1913
- Architectural style: Italianate
- MPS: Rural African-American Churches in Tennessee MPS
- NRHP reference No.: 03001003
- Added to NRHP: October 03, 2003

St. Paul African Methodist Episcopal Church is a historic African Methodist Episcopal church in Fayetteville, Tennessee, United States, located at 521 W. College Street.

The congregation was established as the "African Church" in 1824, probably by white slave-owners wanting to provide a Christian church for their household servants. The original church location was on Rock and Stigall Hill (now Reservoir Hill), about 0.75 miles (1.21 km) northeast of the current church building.

The church moved to its present location on West College Street in 1867. The church's current brick building was completed in 1913. Oral histories indicate that the women of the church delivered brick to the site by carrying bricks in their aprons. When built, the church facade featured three large circular windows; after a fire damaged the building, the circular windows were replaced by rectangular double-hung windows.

The church building was added to the National Register of Historic Places in 2003 following research by Middle Tennessee State University.
