= St. Paul African Methodist Episcopal Church (West Palm Beach, Florida) =

Church in Palm Beach County, Florida

Coordinates: 26.7266°N 80.1192°W

St. Paul African Methodist Episcopal Church, 3345 North Haverhill Road, West Palm Beach, Florida, is a historic church, founded in 1900 by Rev. Charles Long, Sr. It was founded when African-American families were "forced to move" from Palm Beach. Its first name was Gethsemane, and it was first located in the Pleasant City neighborhood.
