= Allen Chapel African Methodist Episcopal Church (Terre Haute, Indiana) =

Church building in Terre Haute, United States of America

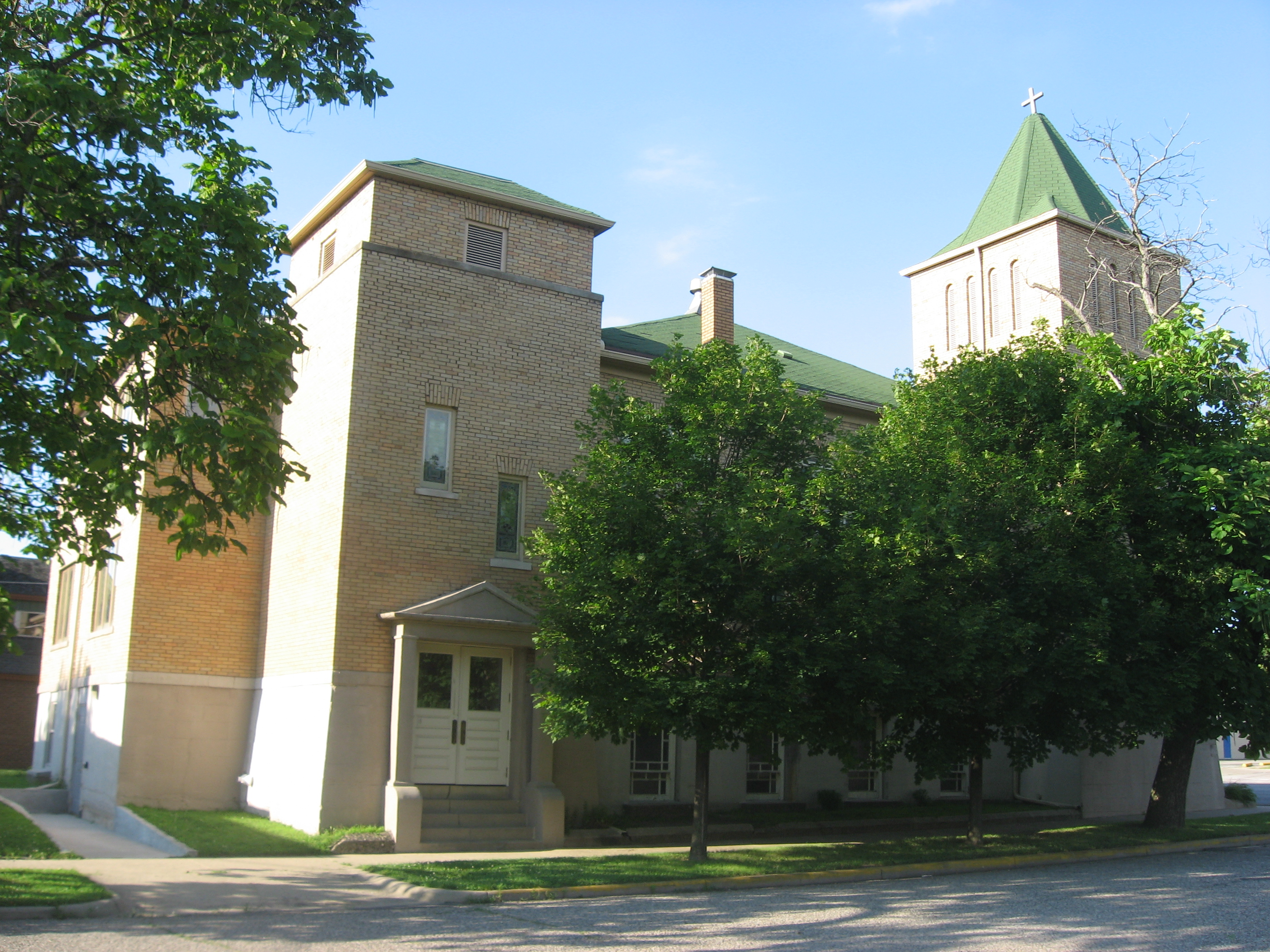
- Southern side of the church

- Location within Vigo County, Indiana Location within Indiana Location within the United States

Religion
- Affiliation: African Methodist Episcopal Church

Location
- Location: 218 Crawford St., Terre Haute, Indiana; United States
- State: Indiana
- Coordinates: 39.459722°N 87.414167°W

Architecture
- Type: church (building)
- Completed: 1913

U.S. National Register of Historic Places
- Added to NRHP: September 5, 1975
- NRHP Reference no.: 03000986

Allen Chapel African Methodist Episcopal Church is a church in Terre Haute, Indiana, United States.

The church is named for Richard Allen, who founded the African Methodist Episcopal Church in Philadelphia in 1787. The congregation in Terre Haute began meeting in 1837 in a small white church in town. This original structure had a tunnel beneath it that led to bank of the Wabash River for escaped slaves going toward Canada on the Underground Railroad. Many of the congregation's early members were freed slaves who had been brought to the area by Quakers.

In 1886, Frederick Douglass went to Terre Haute on two occasions to raise funds for the congregation. Other eminent speakers have included Eugene V. Debs and Jackie Robinson.

The current structure was built in 1913, and is a yellow brick and stone church with a prominent corner tower. It was placed on the National Register of Historic Places in 1975 for its significance in religion, social history, and African American history.
