= Allen Chapel African Methodist Episcopal Church (Lincoln, Illinois) =

Historic church in Illinois, United States

- U.S. National Register of Historic Places
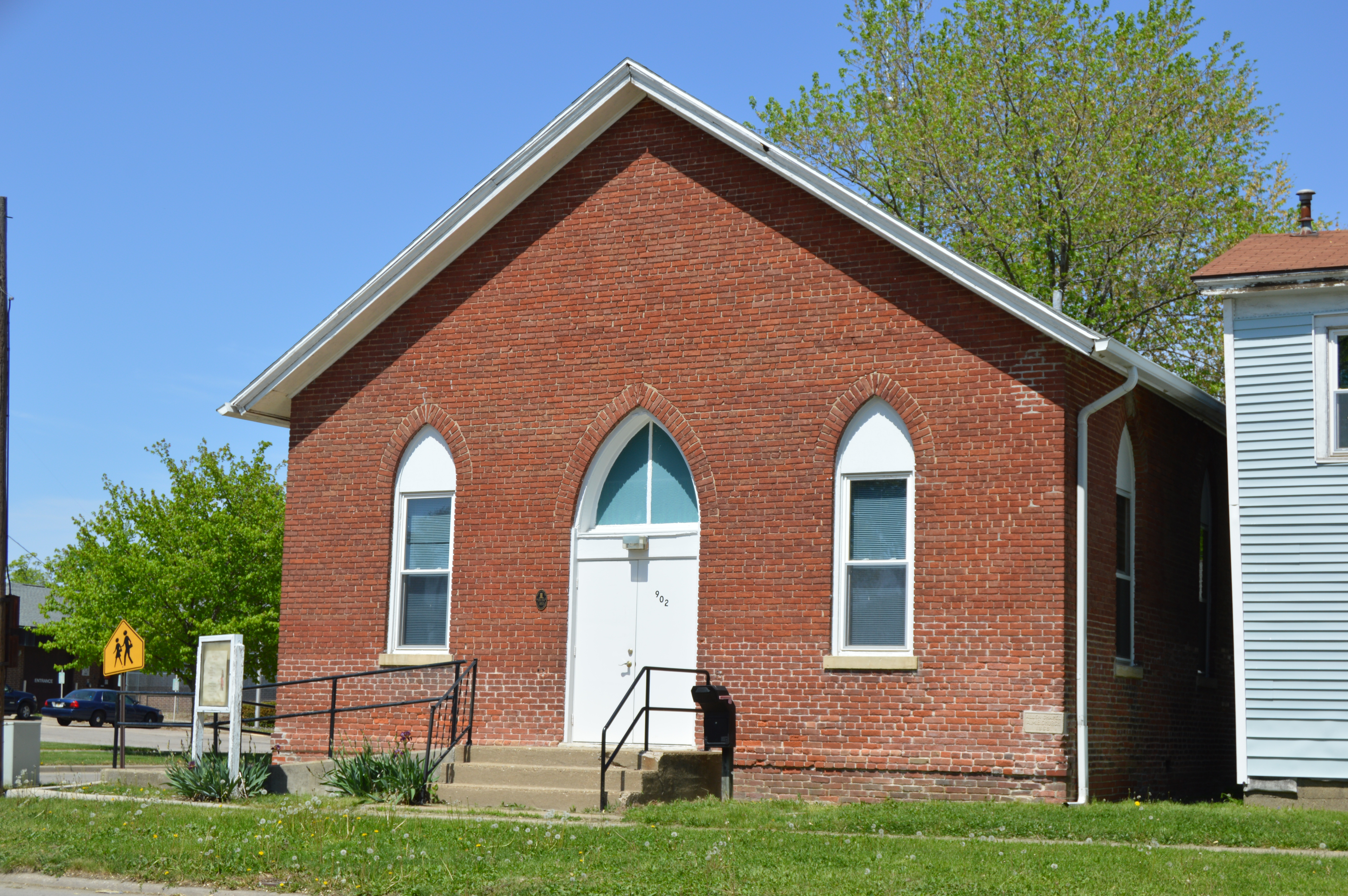
- Front of the church

- Location within Illinois Location within the United States
- Location: 902 Broadway, Lincoln, Illinois
- Coordinates: 40°8′48″N 89°21′33″W
- Area: less than one acre
- Built: 1880
- Architectural style: Gable front
- NRHP reference No.: 04000422
- Added to NRHP: May 12, 2004

Allen Chapel African Methodist Episcopal Church is an African Methodist Episcopal (AME) church located at 902 Broadway in Lincoln, Illinois. As a black church, Allen Chapel served as a center of Lincoln's small African-American community. The church hosted the community's religious and social events. As an AME church, it provided AME publications to and helped educate its members. As Lincoln was both segregated and predominantly white for much of the church's early history, the church played an important role as one of the few organizations dedicated to improving the lives of the city's black residents. The church is still used for religious services.

== Architecture ==
Allen Chapel is a one-story, brick gable front building with a brick foundation. The church was built in 1880 to house Lincoln's African Methodist Episcopal congregation, which formed in 1868. The building has a vernacular design with Gothic arched windows and entrances. There was originally a stained glass window in the transom above the door, but was later replaced with lights with coated glass that resembles stained glass. The windows have limestone sills and their original wood frames are still intact.

The interior of the church has had little alteration, with original plaster walls, wood trim windows, wainscoting, and wood paneled ceilings still in place.

== History ==
In 1868, the congregation began meeting in the home of Rev. Spencer Donegan and his wife Elizabeth Lucenda (née Guy) Donegan. The Donegans worked to found the first AME church in Lincoln. Spencer Donegan had also founded an AME church in Springfield in 1843. Donegan was the Sangamon County delegate to the 1853 Colored Convention in Chicago.

Eight months after the group began meeting, the congregation purchased a local high school for $800. Rev. T. A. Hall was the first pastor. In 1869, the church became a part of the Annual Conference of the Connectional Church and was attached to the Decatur circuit, with assistance from Springfield pastors. Rev. L. M. Davis was then assigned to the church.

In the 1870s, the church also functioned as a school and site for political rallies. In 1876, the African Americans of Logan County met at the church to organize a committee in support of President Ulysses S. Grant.

In 1881, the congregation erected a new red brick building for the cost of about $1,000. Artisans from the congregation and Black community built the structure.

Harlem Renaissance poet Langston Hughes attended services at Allen Chapel as a child. Dr. William "Billy" Dyer, one of the first black military surgeons during World War I, was a member of the congregation.

The church was added to the National Register of Historic Places on May 12, 2004. The Friends of Allen Chapel are leading efforts to help restore the church.
