= Campbell Chapel African Methodist Episcopal Church (Pulaski, Tennessee) =

Historic church in Tennessee, United States

- U.S. National Register of Historic Places
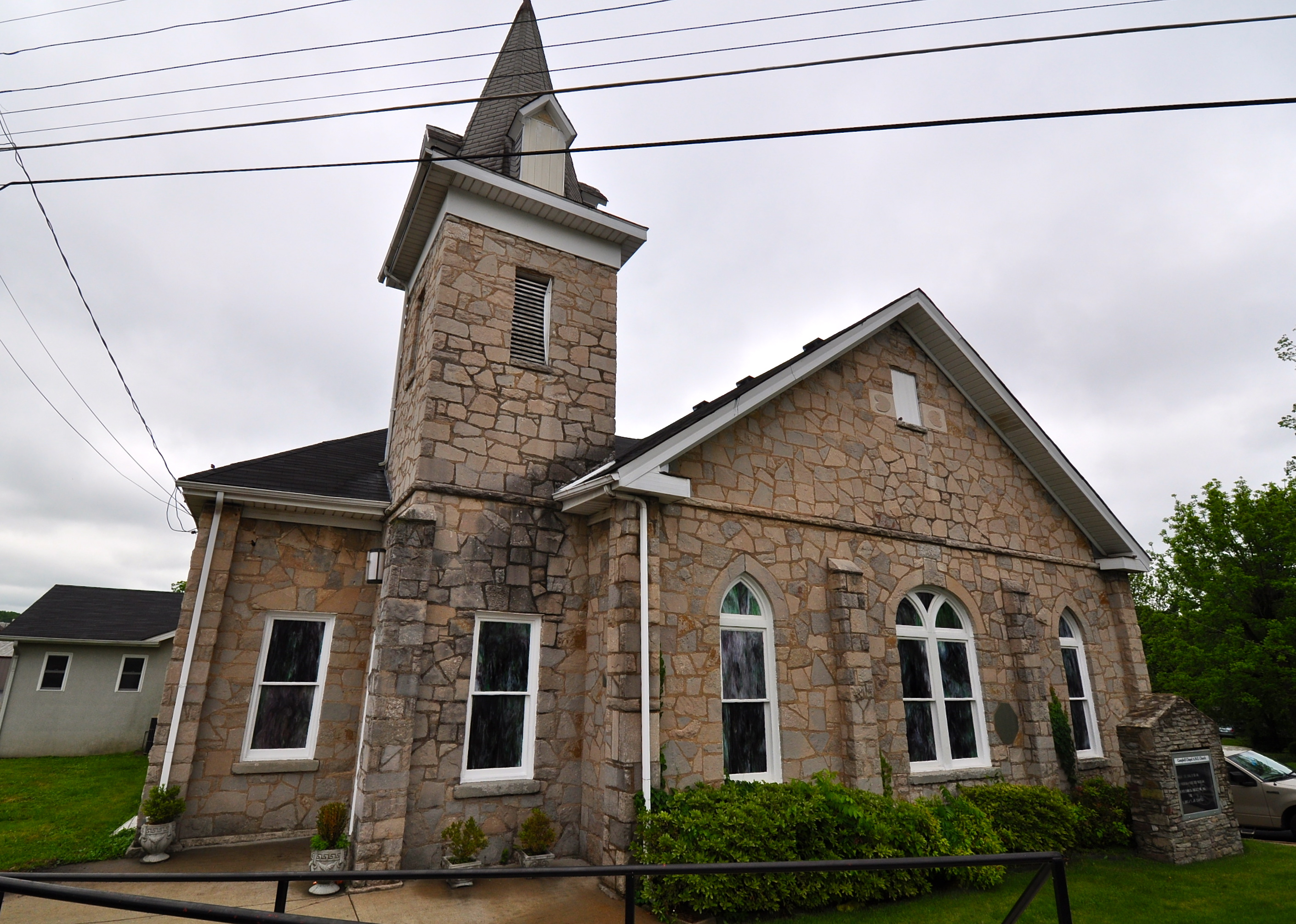
- Campbell Chapel African Methodist Episcopal Church, May 2014.

- Location within Tennessee Location within the United States
- Location: Pulaski, Pulaski, Tennessee
- Coordinates: 35°13′30″N 87°2′15″W
- Area: less than one acre
- Built: 1925
- Architect: Smith, George
- Architectural style: Gothic Revival
- MPS: Rural African-American Churches in Tennessee MPS
- NRHP reference No.: 00000725
- Added to NRHP: June 22, 2000

Campbell Chapel African Methodist Episcopal Church is a historic church in Pulaski, Tennessee.

It was built in 1925. It was added to the National Register of Historic Places in 2000. Its National Register listing recognized its Gothic Revival architectural style and the "exceptional craftsmanship of its stone masonry".
