= St. James AME Zion Church (Ithaca, New York) =

Historic church in New York, United States

- U.S. National Register of Historic Places
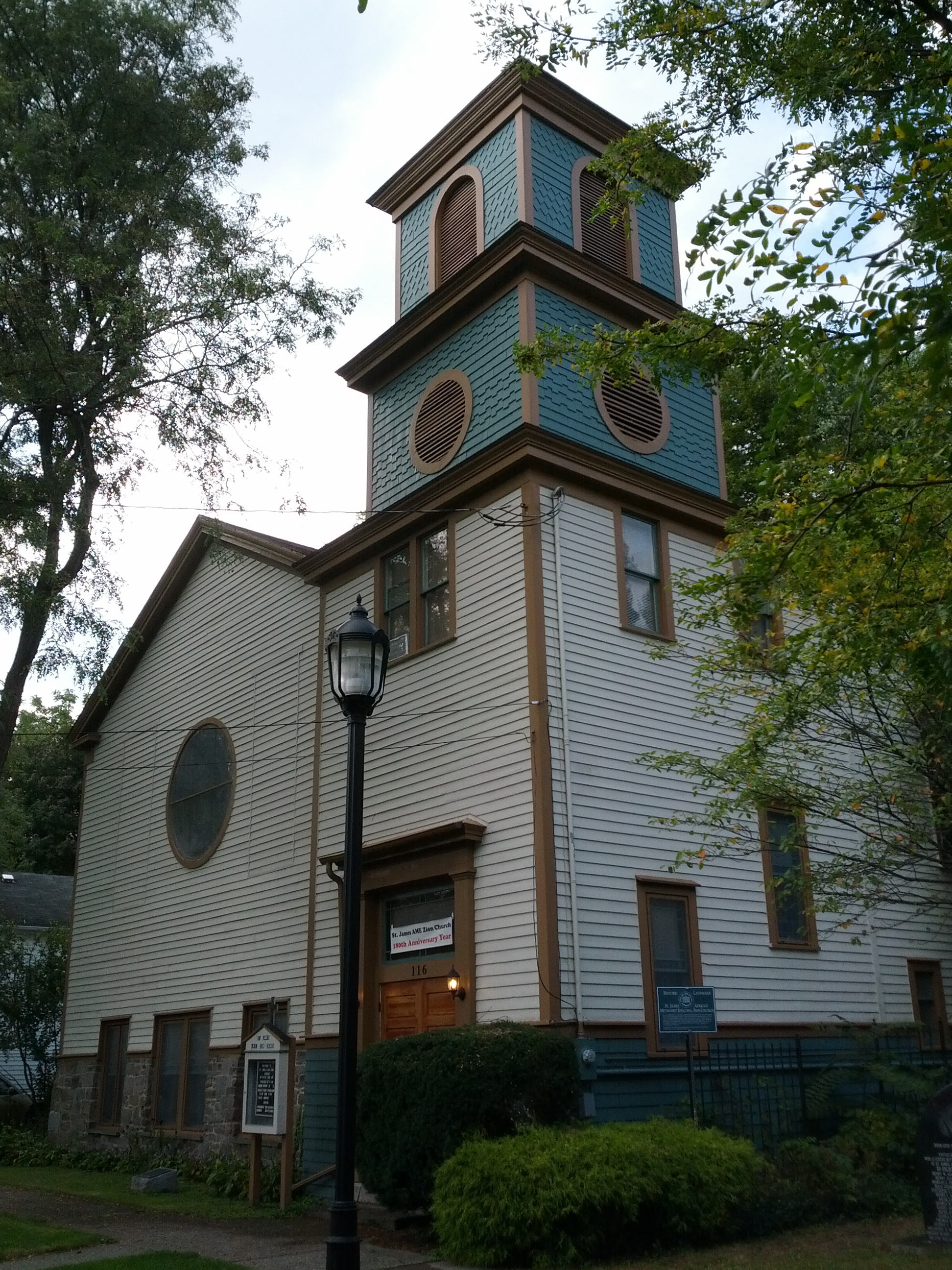

- Location within New York Location within the United States
- Location: 116-118 Cleveland Ave., Ithaca, New York
- Coordinates: 42°26′16″N 76°30′17″W
- Area: less than one acre
- Built: 1836
- NRHP reference No.: 82003407
- Added to NRHP: July 22, 1982

St. James AME Zion Church is a historic African Methodist Episcopal Zion church located at Ithaca in Tompkins County, New York. It is a two-story, frame church structure set on a high foundation and featuring a four-story entrance tower. The church structure was begun in the 1830s and modified many times since. The original stone meetinghouse was built in 1836 and is believed to be Ithaca's oldest church and one of the oldest in the AME Zion system.

Historically, the church has played an important role in the history of Ithaca. During the 19th century, it was the site of abolitionist activity, both by ministers there and as a stop on the Underground Railroad. In the 20th century, the church was the site of the foundation of Alpha Phi Alpha, the nation's first official African American fraternity, and it also held early meetings of the NAACP in the region. It was listed on the National Register of Historic Places in 1982.

== Description ==
The building is a two-story, frame church structure set on a high foundation and featuring a four-story entrance tower. The second story was added to the original building in 1861, the belfry in 1904. 1913 saw the addition of electricity and steam heat. The church also holds a rose window that was added in 1945.

== History ==
The African Methodist Episcopal Zion Church (AME Zion) was founded in 1796 in New York City. A congregation began in Ithaca in 1825, organized by several African-Americans, including Peter Webb, who had moved from Virginia to Caroline, New York, in 1805, and purchased his freedom from slavery several years later. It was not formally chartered as part of the AME Zion Church until December 15, 1833. Henry Johnson served as minister upon its chartering. Webb purchased the original land for the church.

The original church building of St. James AME Zion Church was constructed in 1836, making it both Ithaca's oldest known church, and an early AME Zion Church in America. The land for the church was purchased for five dollars, raised among the 136 African Americans who were living in Ithaca at the time. The church has been described as quickly becoming "the center of political and social activity" for African Americans in the town. The church was also a stop on the Underground Railroad in New York. An estimated 100 people escaping enslavement came through the church. Most were simply passing through as they traveled to Canada. Thomas James and Jermain Wesley Loguen were ministers at the church in the mid 19th century and became known for their antislavery work and involvement in the Underground Railroad. Loguen from 1845 to 1846. Prominent abolitionists such as Harriet Tubman and Frederick Douglass visited the church.

In 1906 the church was the site of the foundation of Alpha Phi Alpha by students at Cornell University, the nation's first official African American fraternity. When a chapter of the NAACP, a civil rights organization, was founded in Ithaca in 1921, it first held meetings at the church. It was named a local landmark in 1972 and listed on the National Register of Historic Places in 1982.

In 2020 Cornell University and the church began excavations around its grounds, largely in an effort to more completely determine the church's role on the Underground Railroad. As of 2026 the church is still active.
