= Campbell Chapel AME Church (Atchison, Kansas) =

Historic church in Kansas, United States

- U.S. National Register of Historic Places
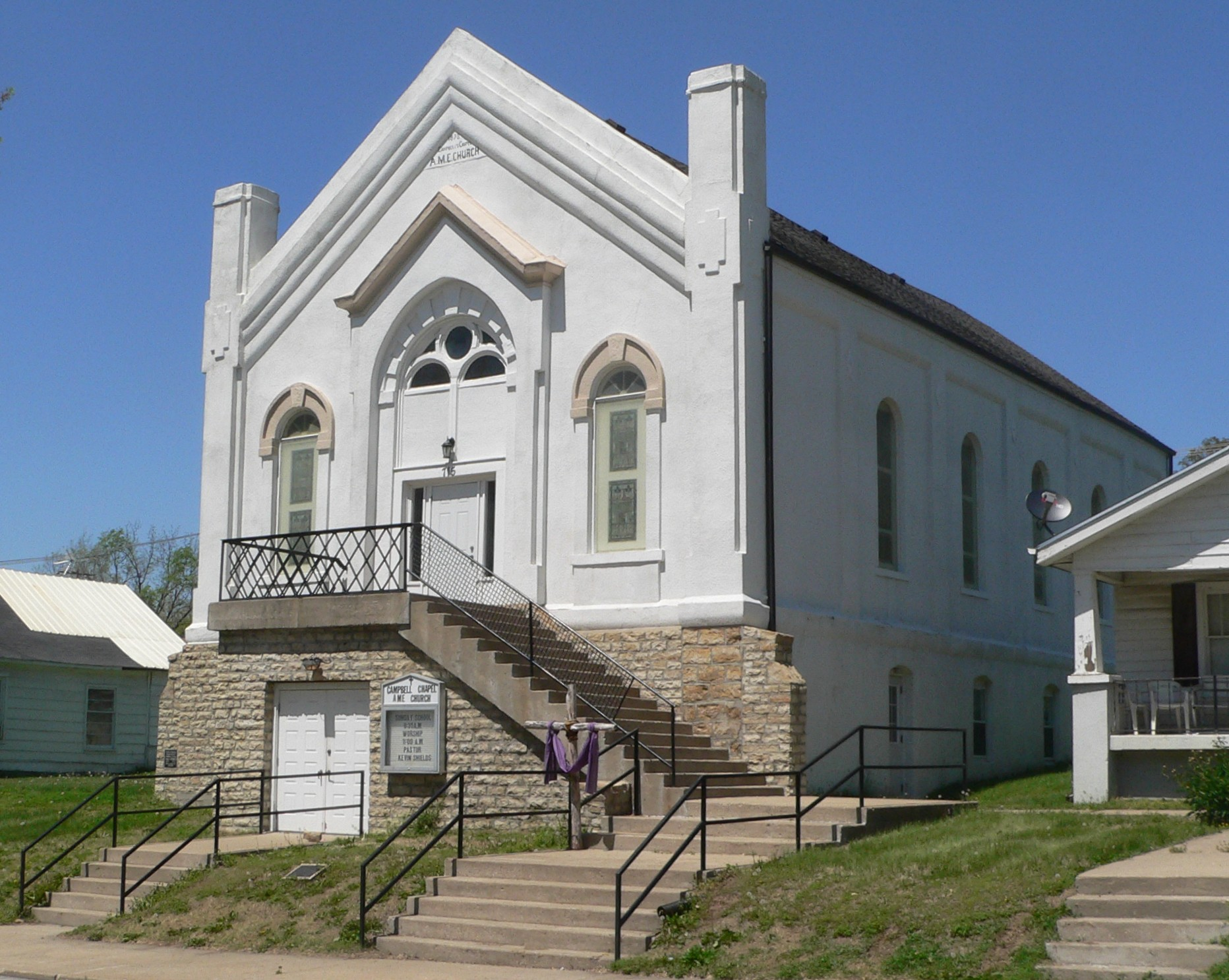

- Location within Kansas Location within the United States
- Location: 715 Atchison St., Atchison, Kansas
- Coordinates: 39.565365°N 95.122376°W
- Built: 1878
- Architectural style: Romanesque
- NRHP reference No.: 02001701
- Added to NRHP: January 17, 2003

The Campbell Chapel AME Church is a church at 715 Atchison Street in Atchison, Kansas. It was built in 1878 and added to the National Register of Historic Places in 2003.

It is a one-story gable-front south-facing church built of red brick in 1878. Its exterior was stuccoed and painted white in 1919. A limestone staircase in front was added in the 1950s.
