= St. James AME Church (New Orleans, Louisiana) =

Historic church in Louisiana, United States

- U.S. National Register of Historic Places
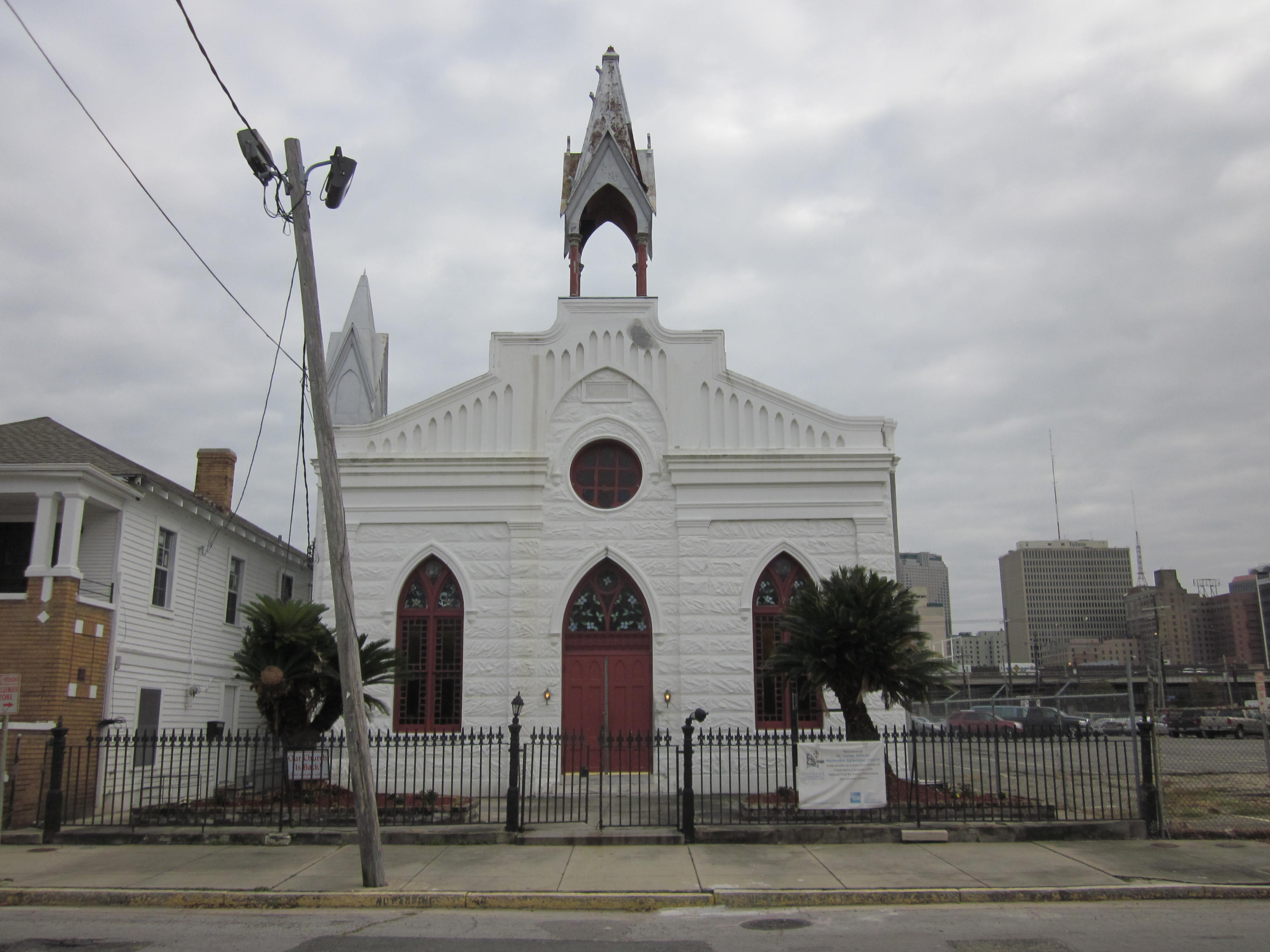

- Location within East New Orleans Location within Louisiana Location within the United States
- Location: 222 N. Roman St., New Orleans, Louisiana
- Coordinates: 29°57′39″N 90°4′43″W
- Area: 0.2 acres (0.081 ha)
- Built: 1848
- Architect: Diboll & Owen
- Architectural style: Neo-Gothic
- NRHP reference No.: 82000449
- Added to NRHP: October 26, 1982

Historic St. James AME Church is a historic church, affiliated with the African Methodist Episcopal Church, the oldest predominantly African American denomination in the United States. The church is located at 222 N. Roman Street in New Orleans, Louisiana. Founded in 1844, Historic St. James is the first church of African Methodism established in the Deep South. The church's pastor is the Reverend Dr. Demetrese Phillips.

The Neo-Gothic church was built in 1848 and added to the National Register of Historic Places in 1982.

== Use in 21 Jump Street (2012) ==
The church played the namesake role in the Hollywood blockbuster, 21 Jump Street (2012).
