= First Methodist Episcopal Church =

First Methodist Episcopal Church, or variations with , South or and Parsonage, may refer to:

in the United States (by state then city)

- First Methodist Episcopal Church, South (Ozark, Arkansas), listed on the National Register of Historic Places (NRHP) in Franklin County
- First Methodist Episcopal Church and Parsonage (Williams, Arizona), listed on the NRHP in Coconino County
- First Methodist Episcopal Church (Monte Vista, Colorado), listed on the NRHP in Rio Grande County
- First Methodist Episcopal Church (Pueblo, Colorado), listed on the NRHP in Pueblo County
- First United Methodist Church (Pueblo, Colorado), also known as First Methodist Episcopal Church, 310 West 11th Street, listed on the NRHP in Pueblo County
- First Methodist Episcopal Church (Trinidad, Colorado), listed on the NRHP in Las Animas County
- First Methodist Episcopal Church (Windsor, Colorado), listed on the NRHP in Weld County
- First Methodist Episcopal Church (Fellsmere, Florida), listed on the NRHP in Indian River County
- First Methodist Episcopal Church (Okeechobee, Florida), listed on the NRHP in Okeechobee County
- Atlanta First Methodist Episcopal Church, listed on the NRHP in Fulton County
- First Methodist Episcopal Church (Stillmore, Georgia), listed on the NRHP in Emanuel County
- First Methodist Episcopal Church (Des Moines, Iowa), listed on the NRHP in Polk County
- First Methodist Episcopal Church (Kensett, Iowa), listed on the NRHP in Worth County
- First Methodist Episcopal Church (Stafford, Kansas), listed on the NRHP in Stafford County
- First Methodist Episcopal Church (Port Hope, Michigan), listed on the NRHP in Huron County
- First Methodist Episcopal Church and Parsonage (Glendive, Montana), listed on the NRHP in Dawson County
- First Methodist Episcopal Church (Montclair, New Jersey), listed on the NRHP in Essex County
- First Methodist Episcopal Church (Washington, New Jersey), listed on the NRHP in Warren County
- First Methodist Episcopal Church (Albuquerque, New Mexico), listed on the NRHP in Bernalillo County
- First Methodist Episcopal Church (St. Johnsville, New York), listed on the NRHP in Montgomery County
- First Methodist Episcopal Church (Alliance, Ohio), listed on the NRHP in Stark County
- First Methodist Episcopal Church (Canton, Ohio), listed on the NRHP in Stark County
- First Methodist Episcopal Church (Massillon, Ohio), listed on the NRHP in Stark County
- First Methodist Episcopal Church (Vermillion, South Dakota), listed on the NRHP in Clay County
- First Methodist Episcopal Church, South (Humboldt, Tennessee), listed on the NRHP in Gibson County
- First Methodist Episcopal Church (Salt Lake City, Utah), listed on the NRHP in Salt Lake County
- Daniels Recital Hall, formerly First Methodist Episcopal Church, Seattle, Washington, listed on the NRHP in King County
- First Methodist Episcopal Church (Eau Claire, Wisconsin), listed on the NRHP in Eau Claire County

== See also ==
- First Methodist Episcopal Church, South (disambiguation)
- First Methodist Episcopal Church and Parsonage (disambiguation)
