= National Register of Historic Places listings in Stafford County, Kansas =

Location of Stafford County in Kansas

This is a list of the National Register of Historic Places listings in Stafford County, Kansas. It is intended to be a complete list of the properties and districts on the National Register of Historic Places in Stafford County, Kansas, United States. The locations of National Register properties and districts for which the latitude and longitude coordinates are included below, may be seen in an online map.

There are 9 properties and districts listed on the National Register in the county.

This National Park Service list is complete through NPS recent listings posted November 13, 2026.

== Current listings ==
| | Name on the Register | Image | Date listed | Location | City or town | Description |
|---|---|---|---|---|---|---|
| 1 | Comanche Archeological Site | | September 18, 1978 (#78001290) | Western edge of the Quivira National Wildlife Refuge | Stafford | |
| 2 | Covenanter Church | Covenanter Church | June 8, 2005 (#05000544) | 113 N. Green St. 37°57′46″N 98°36′21″W | Stafford | |
| 3 | Farmers National Bank | Farmers National Bank | May 17, 2006 (#06000392) | 100 N. Main; 37°57′43″N 98°35′59″W | Stafford | |
| 4 | First Methodist Episcopal Church | First Methodist Episcopal Church | October 31, 2002 (#02001264) | 219 W. Stafford; 37°57′49″N 98°36′09″W | Stafford | |
| 5 | William R. Gray Photography Studio and Residence | William R. Gray Photography Studio and Residence | January 2, 2013 (#12001121) | 116 N. Main; 37°59′59″N 98°45′42″W | St. John | |
| 6 | Sarah L. Henderson House | Sarah L. Henderson House | July 19, 1996 (#96000763) | 518 W. Stafford St. 37°58′21″N 98°36′18″W | Stafford | |
| 7 | Nora E. Larabee Memorial Library | Nora E. Larabee Memorial Library | May 11, 2006 (#06000391) | 108 N. Union St. 37°57′44″N 98°36′06″W | Stafford | |
| 8 | Martin Cemetery | Martin Cemetery | October 5, 2015 (#15000692) | US 50, 1/4 mi. W. of US 281; 37°57′22″N 98°46′29″W | St. John | |
| 9 | Joseph L. Spickard House | Joseph L. Spickard House | June 8, 2005 (#05000546) | 201 N. Green St. 37°57′48″N 98°36′21″W | Stafford | |

== See also ==
- List of National Historic Landmarks in Kansas
- National Register of Historic Places listings in Kansas
