= First Methodist Episcopal Church, South =

First Methodist Episcopal Church, South may refer to one of several churches in the United States:

- First Methodist Episcopal Church, South (Ozark, Arkansas), listed on the National Register of Historic Places (NRHP) in Franklin County, Arkansas
- First Methodist Episcopal Church, South (Perry, Florida), listed on the NRHP in Taylor County, Florida
- First Methodist Episcopal Church, South (Atlanta, Georgia), listed on the NRHP in Fulton County, Georgia
- First Methodist Episcopal Church, South (Vinita, Oklahoma), NRHP-listed
- First Methodist Episcopal Church, South (Humboldt, Tennessee), listed on the NRHP in Gibson County, Tennessee

== See also ==
- First Methodist Episcopal Church (disambiguation)
