= Farmers National Bank =

Farmers National Bank may refer to:

in the United States (by state)

- Farmers National Bank (Stafford, Kansas), listed on the National Register of Historic Places in Stafford County, Kansas
- Farmers National Bank of Kittanning (Kittanning, Pennsylvania)
- Farmers National Bank (Plain City, Ohio), listed on the National Register of Historic Places in Madison County, Ohio
- Farmers National Bank (Hillsboro, Texas), listed on the National Register of Historic Places in Hill County, Texas

== See also ==
- Farmers Bank Building (disambiguation)
