= First Methodist Episcopal Church and Parsonage =

First Methodist Episcopal Church and Parsonage may refer to:

- First Methodist Episcopal Church and Parsonage (Williams, Arizona), listed on the National Register of Historic Places in Coconino County, Arizona
- First Methodist Episcopal Church and Parsonage (Glendive, Montana), listed on the National Register of Historic Places in Dawson County, Montana

== See also ==
- First Methodist Episcopal Church (disambiguation)
