= FNB =

FNB may refer to:

== Financial institutions ==
- Farmers National Bank (disambiguation)
- First National Bank (disambiguation)
- First Nations Bank of Canada
- First Niagara Bank, an American bank
- Florida National Bank, an American bank
- FNB Corporation, an American financial services corporation
- FNB United Corp., an American bank holding company

== Transport ==
- Brenner Field, in Nebraska, United States
- Farnborough (Main) railway station, in England
- Ferrotramviaria, an Italian rail operator managing the Ferrovie del Nord Barese network
- Neubrandenburg Airport, in Mecklenburg-Vorpommern, Germany

== Other uses ==
- Benin Navy (French: Forces Navales Beninois)
- Food Not Bombs, an anti-hunger activist group
- Fox Business Network, an American financial news network
- Friday Night Baseball on Apple TV+, a baseball broadcast by Apple Inc.
- The Friday Night Boys, an American rock band
- New Belgian Front (French: Front Nouveau de Belgique), a Belgian political party
- People's Action No to More Road Tolls (Norwegian: Folkeaksjonen nei til mer bompenger), a Norwegian political party
- Suomen Tietotoimisto (Swedish: Finska Notisbyrån Ab), a Finnish news agency
- FNB Stadium, a South African soccer stadium
- 4 Non Blondes, an American pop rock band
