= Kensett, Iowa =

- City
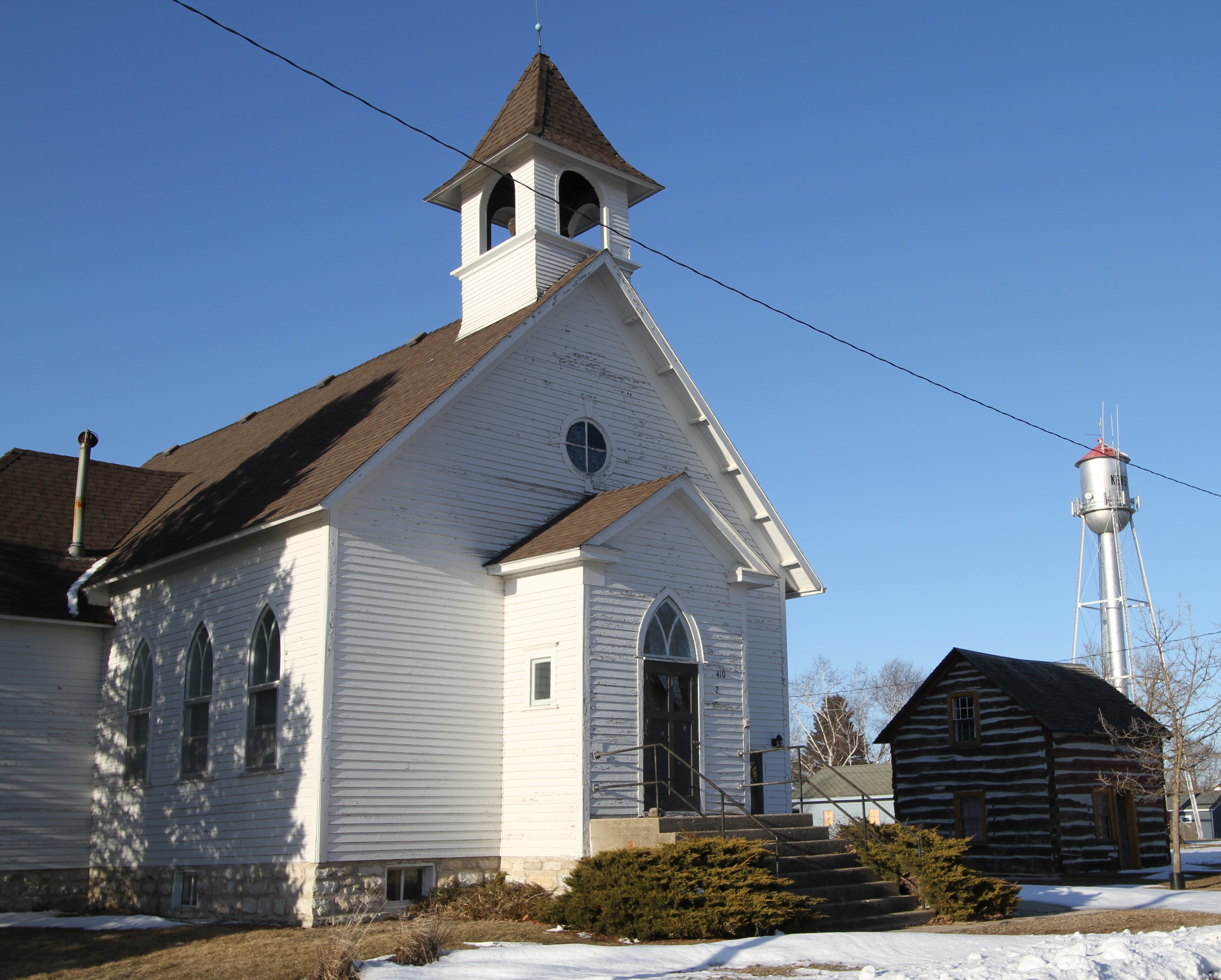
- Kensett Methodist Church and the town water tower

- Location of Kensett, Iowa
- Coordinates: 43°21′12″N 93°12′39″W
- Country: USA
- State: Iowa
- County: Worth

Area
  - Total: 1.01 sq mi (2.62 km^{2})
  - Land: 1.01 sq mi (2.62 km^{2})
  - Water: 0 sq mi (0.00 km^{2})
- Elevation: 1,221 ft (372 m)

Population (2020)
  - Total: 257
  - Density: 253.7/sq mi (97.96/km^{2})
- Time zone: UTC-6 (Central (CST))
  - Summer (DST): UTC-5 (CDT)
- ZIP code: 50448
- Area code: 641
- FIPS code: 19-40665
- GNIS feature ID: 2395509
- Website: www.kensettia.com

Kensett is a city in Worth County, Iowa, United States. The population was 257 at the time of the 2020 census. It is part of the Mason City Micropolitan Statistical Area.

== History ==
Kensett was platted in 1872 shortly after the railroad was built through that territory in 1871.

== Geography ==
According to the United States Census Bureau, the city has a total area of 1.53 square miles (3.96 km^{2}), all land.

== Demographics ==
Historical populations
Year	Pop.	±%
1900	459	—
1910	360	−21.6%
1920	338	−6.1%
1930	394	+16.6%
1940	392	−0.5%
1950	424	+8.2%
1960	409	−3.5%
1970	361	−11.7%
1980	360	−0.3%
1990	298	−17.2%
2000	280	−6.0%
2010	266	−5.0%
2020	257	−3.4%
Source:"U.S. Census website". United States Census Bureau. and Iowa Data Center; Source: U.S. Decennial Census

=== 2020 census ===
As of the census of 2020, there were 257 people, 128 households, and 72 families residing in the city. The population density was 253.7 inhabitants per square mile (98.0/km^{2}). There were 135 housing units at an average density of 133.3 per square mile (51.5/km^{2}). The racial makeup of the city was 98.1% White, 0.0% Black or African American, 0.0% Native American, 0.8% Asian, 0.0% Pacific Islander, 0.0% from other races and 1.2% from two or more races. Hispanic or Latino persons of any race comprised 1.6% of the population.

Of the 128 households, 22.7% of which had children under the age of 18 living with them, 43.0% were married couples living together, 10.9% were cohabitating couples, 25.8% had a female householder with no spouse or partner present and 20.3% had a male householder with no spouse or partner present. 43.8% of all households were non-families. 33.6% of all households were made up of individuals, 12.5% had someone living alone who was 65 years old or older.

The median age in the city was 45.8 years. 21.8% of the residents were under the age of 20; 4.3% were between the ages of 20 and 24; 23.0% were from 25 and 44; 27.2% were from 45 and 64; and 23.7% were 65 years of age or older. The gender makeup of the city was 51.0% male and 49.0% female.

=== 2010 census ===
At the 2010 census there were 266 people in 125 households, including 77 families, in the city. The population density was 173.9 inhabitants per square mile (67.1/km^{2}). There were 142 housing units at an average density of 92.8 per square mile (35.8/km^{2}). The racial makup of the city was 98.1% White, 1.1% Asian, 0.4% from other races, and 0.4% from two or more races. Hispanic or Latino of any race were 0.8%.

Of the 125 households 16.8% had children under the age of 18 living with them, 47.2% were married couples living together, 9.6% had a female householder with no husband present, 4.8% had a male householder with no wife present, and 38.4% were non-families. 32.8% of households were one person and 14.4% were one person aged 65 or older. The average household size was 2.13 and the average family size was 2.60.

The median age was 50.3 years. 15% of residents were under the age of 18; 6.5% were between the ages of 18 and 24; 21.4% were from 25 to 44; 36.5% were from 45 to 64; and 20.7% were 65 or older. The gender makeup of the city was 49.6% male and 50.4% female.

=== 2000 census ===
As of the census of 2000, there were 280 people in 131 households, including 77 families, in the city. The population density was 183.5 inhabitants per square mile (70.8/km^{2}). There were 143 housing units at an average density of 93.7 per square mile (36.2/km^{2}). The racial makup of the city was 100.00% White.

Of the 131 households 19.8% had children under the age of 18 living with them, 51.1% were married couples living together, 4.6% had a female householder with no husband present, and 40.5% were non-families. 35.1% of households were one person and 18.3% were one person aged 65 or older. The average household size was 2.14 and the average family size was 2.67.

The age distribution was 20.0% under the age of 18, 7.5% from 18 to 24, 26.8% from 25 to 44, 26.8% from 45 to 64, and 18.9% 65 or older. The median age was 44 years. For every 100 females, there were 101.4 males. For every 100 females age 18 and over, there were 100.0 males.

The median household income was $30,500 and the median family income was $40,000. Males had a median income of $29,000 versus $20,179 for females. The per capita income for the city was $15,601. About 14.3% of families and 17.2% of the population were below the poverty line, including 35.1% of those under the age of eighteen and 14.0% of those sixty five or over.

== Education ==
The Northwood–Kensett Community School District operates local area public schools.
