= Tony Fields =

American dancer (1958–1995)

- Born: Anthony Dean Campos; December 28, 1958; Stafford, Kansas, U.S.
- Died: February 27, 1995 (aged 36); Dunsmuir, California, U.S.
- Occupations: Dancer; actor
- Years active: 1978-1995

Tony Fields (December 28, 1958 – February 27, 1995) was an American dancer and actor, famous for his performances on the television show Solid Gold, several videos for Michael Jackson, and the film version of the American musical A Chorus Line.

== Early life ==
Fields was born Anthony Dean Campos in Stafford, Kansas. After his parents separated when he was four, his mother remarried, and he took his stepfather's last name: Fields. He was raised in Davis, California, showed an early aptitude for gymnastics, then began dance training. He attended Davis High School, graduating in 1977. Fields went to college at the Pacific Conservatory of the Performing Arts on a scholarship and Roland Dupree Academy of Dance, but left when paid work began to materialize.

== Work on film and television ==
Fields moved to Hollywood to pursue his career and started performing as a backup dancer in Debbie Reynolds' nightclub act. He then found a job on the Solid Gold as a dancer in 1979. Fields continued with Solid Gold until 1985. During this time, he performed in the music video for Queen's "Body Language" at Freddie Mercury's request.

In 1983, Fields performed in Michael Jackson's videos "Beat It" and "Thriller", both choreographed by Michael Peters as well as Lionel Richie's video "Running with the Night".

Richard Attenborough was working on a film version of the Broadway musical A Chorus Line in 1984. After a casting call that attracted over 3,000 people, and auditions by anyone who previously performed in the musical, Fields won the role of Al DeLuca.

Fields' film work continued with roles in Trick or Treat (1986), Body Beat (1987), The Doctor (1991) and Across the Moon (1995) and television shows such as Murder, She Wrote (1992), L.A. Law (1991) and Monsters (1990). He appeared in 11 episodes of the soap opera Santa Barbara. He also performed in plays and musical theatre in California.

Fields gradually became ill and was no longer able to sustain the physical demands of dancing; he returned to Davis High School to mentor students in 1994.

Fields died of HIV-related cancer in 1995.

== Legacy ==
Fields is honored each year at Davis Senior High School with the showcase "A Tribute to Tony Fields" , celebrating the arts program of the school. He was inducted into the high school's hall of fame in 2009, and a scholarship is available in his name.
