= First Methodist Episcopal Church (Pueblo, Colorado) =

Historic church in Colorado, United States

- U.S. National Register of Historic Places
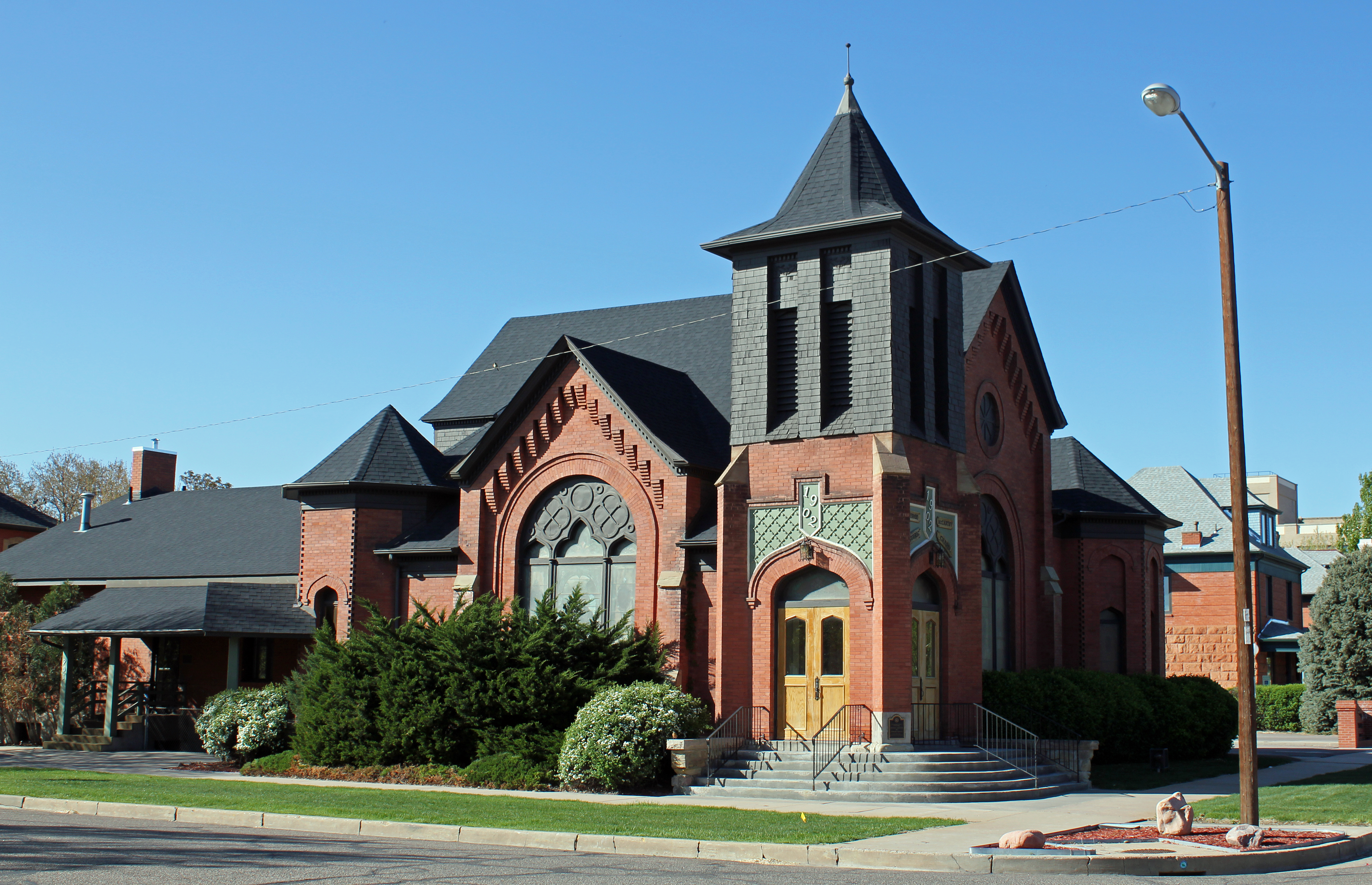

- Location within Colorado Location within the United States
- Location: 400 Broadway St., Pueblo, Colorado
- Coordinates: 38°15′19″N 104°37′23″W
- Area: less than one acre
- Built: 1902
- Architect: George W. Roe
- Architectural style: Romanesque
- NRHP reference No.: 79000620
- Added to NRHP: November 14, 1979

The old First Methodist Episcopal Church, also known as First Methodist Episcopal Church, South, is a historic redbrick Southern Methodist church building located at 400 Broadway in Pueblo, Colorado. Designed by George W. Roe in the Romanesque Revival style of architecture, it was built in 1902. In 1939 it became the Trinity Methodist Church. Bought by the George F McCarthy Funeral Home in 1954, it is now the George McCarthy Historic Chapel and is used for funeral services.

On November 14, 1979, it was added to the National Register of Historic Places

It is a one-and-a-half-story stretcher bond brick building.

The church was organized in 1871 and had its first building, the Corona Chapel, built in 1877 at what is now 217 Midway.
