= First Methodist Episcopal Church (Okeechobee, Florida) =

Historic church in Florida, United States

First Methodist Episcopal Church 200 NW 2nd Street Okeechobee, Florida
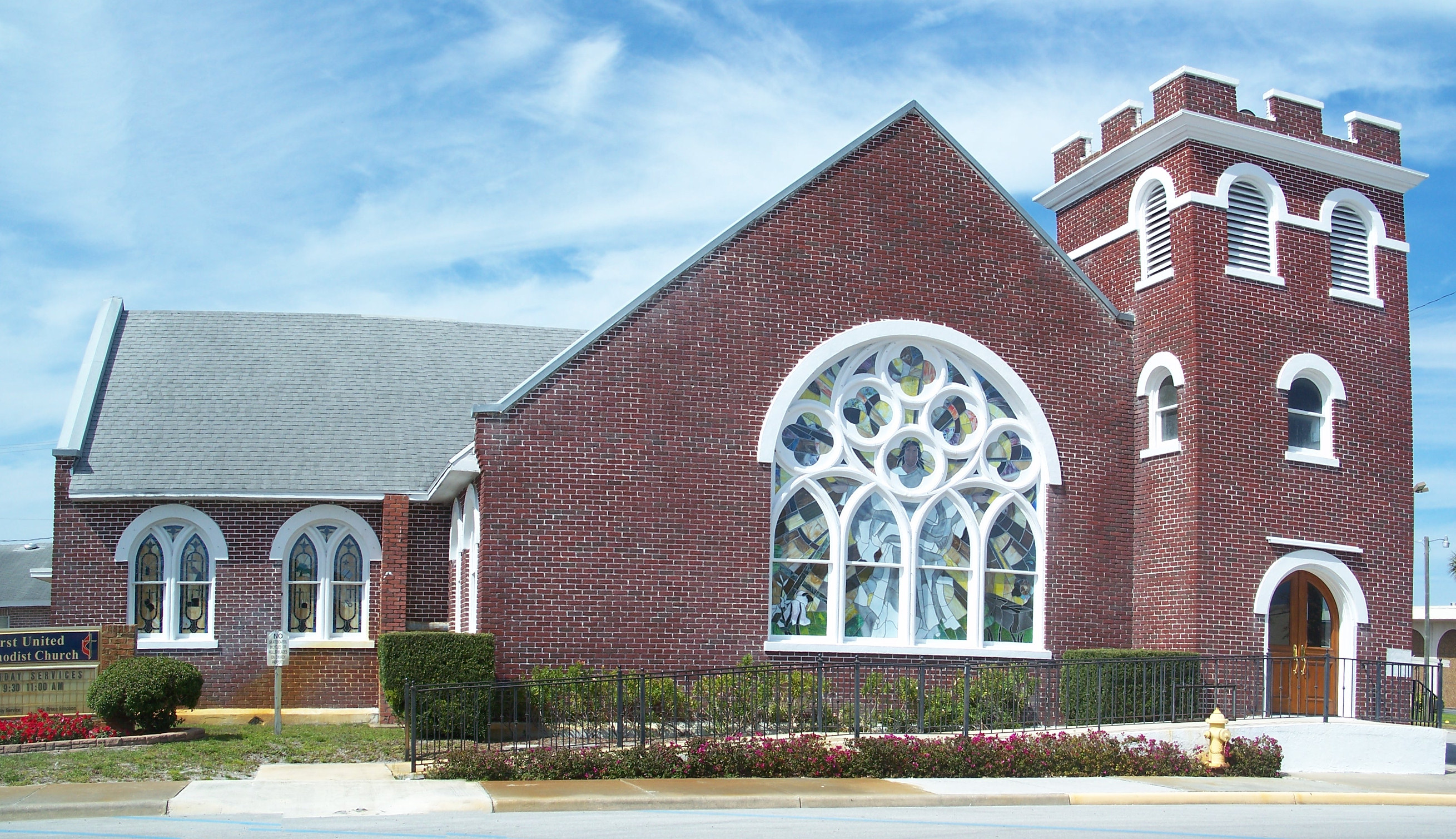
- First Methodist Episcopal Church 200 NW 2nd Street Okeechobee, Florida
- Denomination: United Methodist Church
- Website: http://www.fumcokee.com/

Clergy
- Pastor(s): The Rev. Don Hanna, senior pastor, Jim Dawson, ass't pastor/youth pastor
- First Methodist Episcopal Church, South
- U.S. National Register of Historic Places
- Location within Florida
- Coordinates: 27°14′43.02″N 80°49′54″W
- NRHP reference No.: 15000509
- Added to NRHP: August 10, 2015

The First Methodist Episcopal Church, built in 1924, is a historic red brick Gothic Revival church located at 200 NW 2nd Street in Okeechobee, Florida. In 1989, it was listed in A Guide to Florida's Historic Architecture, published by the University of Florida Press. In August 2015, it was listed on the U.S. National Register of Historic Places, as the First Methodist Episcopal Church, South.

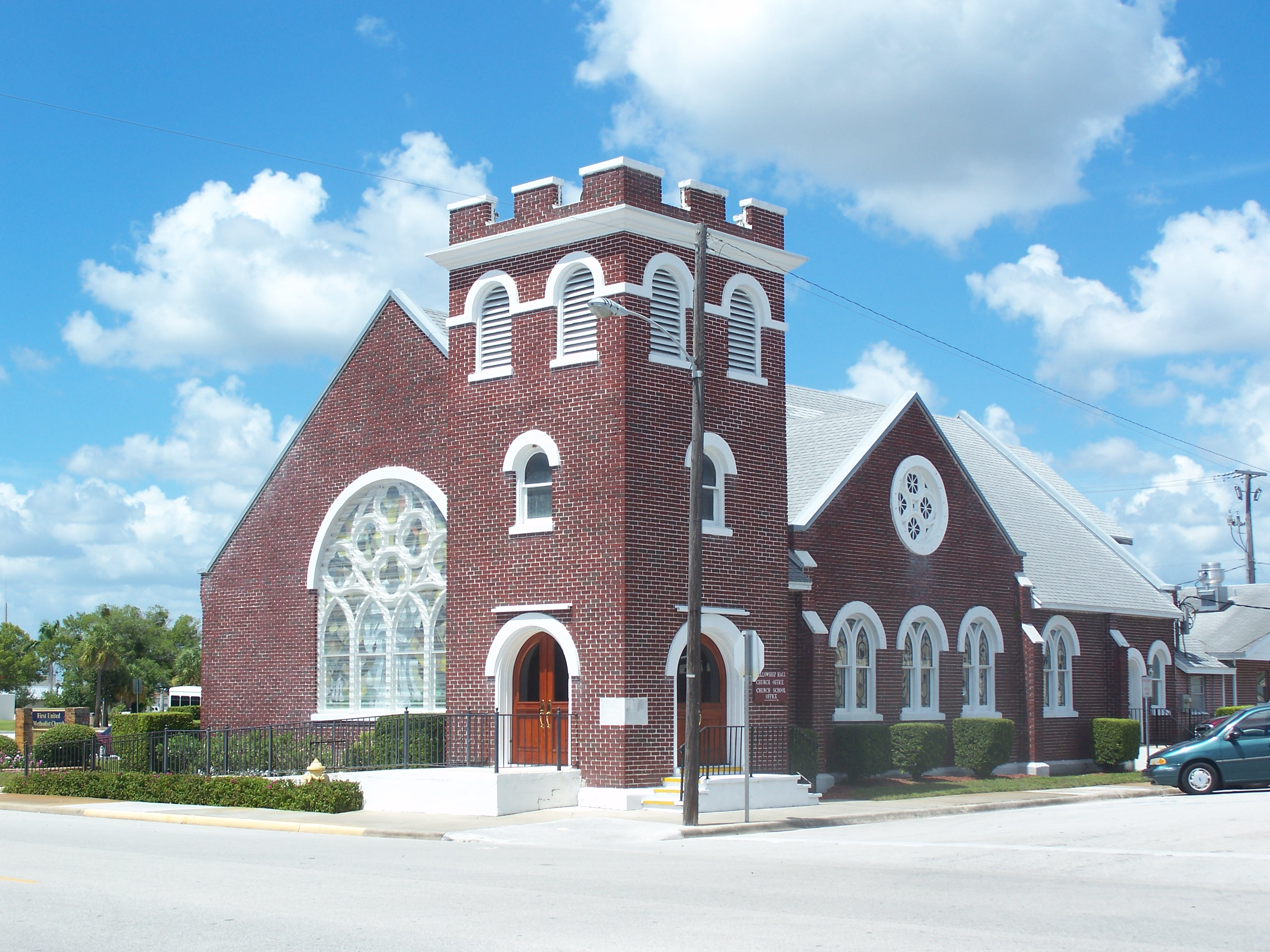
View of the church from the southeast in 2010

Today it is known as First United Methodist Church.
