= First Methodist Episcopal Church (Vermillion, South Dakota) =

Historic church in South Dakota, United States

- U.S. National Register of Historic Places
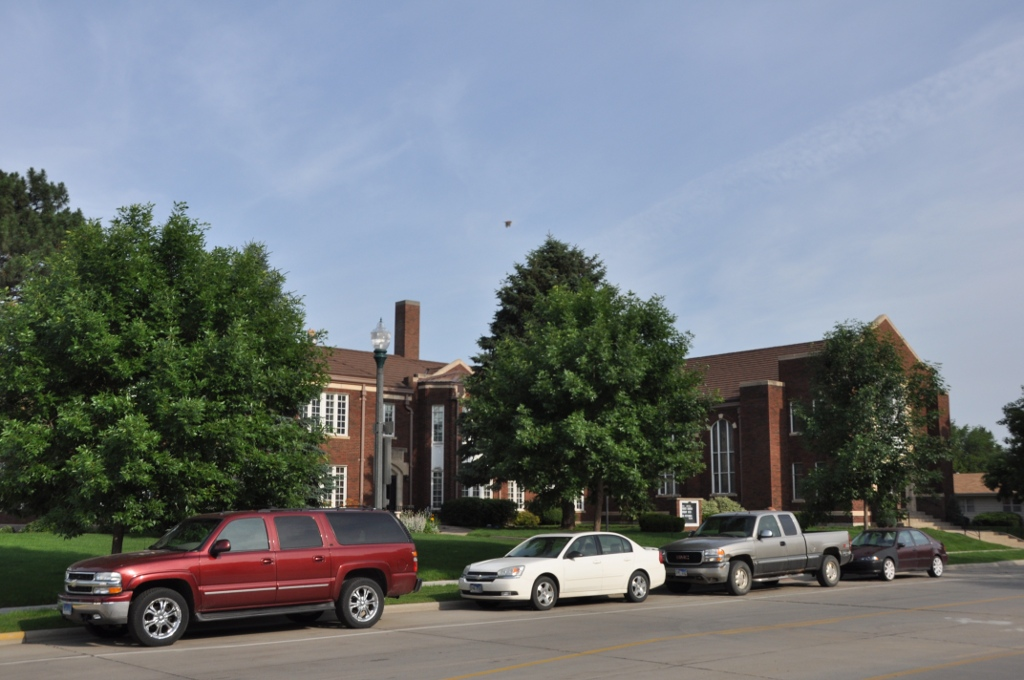

- Location within South Dakota Location within the United States
- Location: 14-16 North Dakota St., Vermillion, South Dakota
- Coordinates: 42°46′46″N 96°55′46″W
- Area: less than one acre
- Built: 1927-29
- Architect: Jansson, Edward
- Architectural style: Late Gothic Revival
- NRHP reference No.: 03001522
- Added to NRHP: January 28, 2004

The First Methodist Episcopal Church in Vermillion, South Dakota is a historic church at 14-16 North Dakota Street. It has also been known as First United Methodist Church. It was built during 1927-29 and was added to the National Register in 2004.

It was deemed significant "as a well preserved example of a Late Gothic Revival style and a sub-type termed castellated or parapeted. It is an excellent example of this style in South Dakota."
