= Farmers National Bank (Stafford, Kansas) =

- U.S. National Register of Historic Places
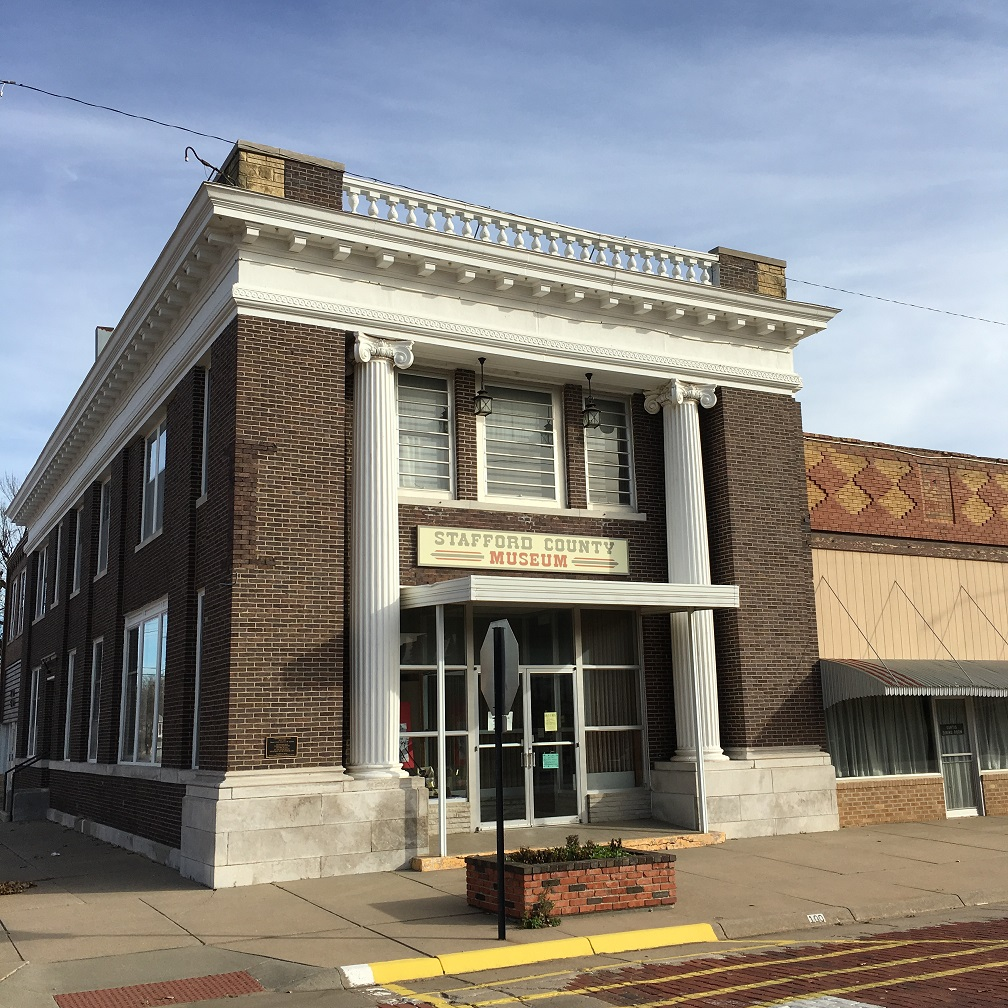

- Location within Kansas
- Location: 100 S. Main, Stafford, Kansas
- Coordinates: 37.961944°N 98.599722°W
- Area: less than one acre
- Built: 1905
- Built by: Lew Dellinger
- Architect: Charles E. Shepard
- Architectural style: Classical Revival
- NRHP reference No.: 06000392
- Added to NRHP: May 17, 2006

The Farmers National Bank at 100 S. Main St. in Stafford, Kansas is a Classical Revival style building constructed in 1905. It was listed on the National Register of Historic Places in 2006.

The bank operated in a frame structure at 100 N. Main across from this building starting in 1886, then shifted to a bank building at this location which was destroyed by fire in February 1905. The building was promptly designed and built and opened in November 1905. It is significant partly for the relatively high quality architecture provided by architect Charles E. Shepard of the Kansas City-based architectural firm of Shepard, Farrar; it was unusual for a small town bank to obtain such services. A 1906 addition at the back was the home of the telephone company.

In 2006, it was home of the Stafford Historical & Genealogical Society & Museum, which also occupied the 100 N. Main building.
