= First Methodist Episcopal Church (Alliance, Ohio) =

Historic church in Ohio, United States

- First Methodist Episcopal Church of Alliance, Ohio
- U.S. National Register of Historic Places
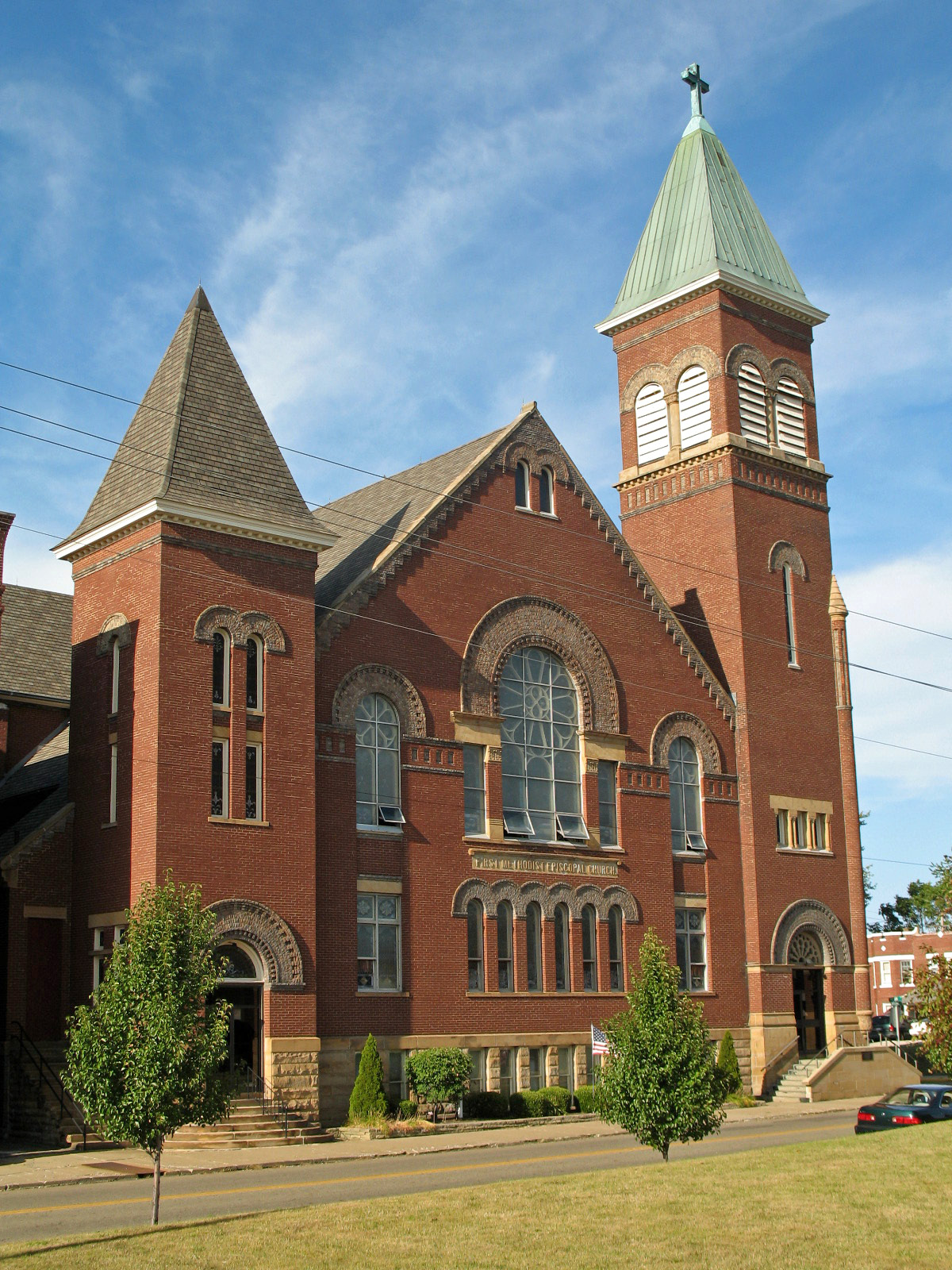

- Location within Ohio Location within the United States
- Location: 470 E. Broadway St., Alliance, Ohio
- Coordinates: 40°55′10″N 81°5′58″W
- Area: less than one acre
- Built: 1895
- Architect: Lewis Thomas; Edward L. Miller
- Architectural style: Romanesque
- NRHP reference No.: 85000945
- Added to NRHP: May 2, 1985

First Methodist Episcopal Church of Alliance, Ohio is a historic church at 470 E. Broadway Street in Alliance, Ohio.

It was built in 1895 and added to the National Register in 1985.
