= Stafford Reformed Presbyterian Church =

Historic church in Kansas, United States

- Covenanter Church
- U.S. National Register of Historic Places
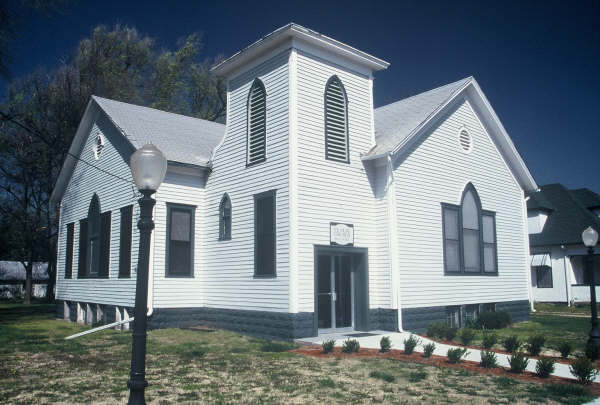
- Streetside view of the church

- Location within Kansas Location within the United States
- Location: 113 N. Green Ave., Stafford, Kansas
- Coordinates: 37°57′46″N 98°36′21″W
- Area: Less than one acre
- Built: 1913
- Architectural style: Gothic Revival
- NRHP reference No.: 05000544
- Added to NRHP: June 8, 2005

The Stafford Reformed Presbyterian Church, also known as Covenanter Church, is a historic church in Stafford, Kansas, United States. Constructed in 1913, the building is a small-sized example of Gothic Revival architecture. It replaced an older church built on the same site, which was demolished because it had fallen into poor condition. The church itself existed as a part of the Reformed Presbyterian Church of North America (RPCNA) from 1911 to 1961. The building was added to the National Register of Historic Places on June 8, 2005 for its architectural significance. Today, the church is owned by a local company, Henderson House Inn and Retreat Center, which uses it as part of its conference center.

== Structure ==
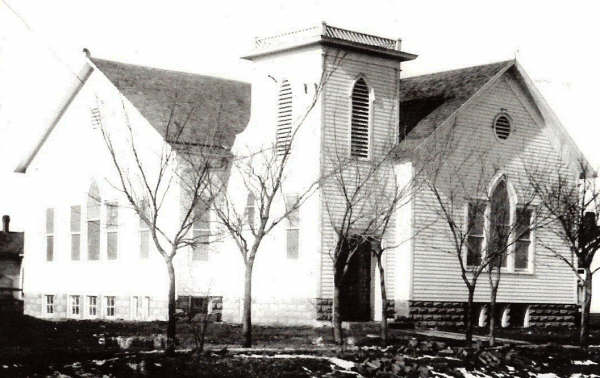
The church upon its completion

Both frame and concrete were employed in the construction of the church. Its original dimensions were approximately 30×42 feet (9×13 m); a basement was also included. The congregation needed aid from a denominational board to finance the construction; according to the board, the construction cost was approximately $6,000. It was dedicated on January 13, 1914.

== Congregational history ==
Stafford Reformed Presbyterian Church was organized on January 19, 1911, largely under the leadership of R. A. Boyd. A longtime minister of the Associate Presbyterian Church, Boyd had been the pastor of the Associate Presbyterian congregation in Stafford since 1900, but he came to hold Reformed Presbyterian views and took much of his church with him into the RPCNA. In 1911, the latter denomination included just 105 congregations throughout the United States; therefore, the sudden beginning of a new church in rural Kansas, its subsequent rapid growth, and the erection of its new building attracted significant interest across the denomination. Conversely, the congregation rarely attracted much attention in official documents after the mid-1910s, being noted only for its struggles in the Dust Bowl in 1935 and for the death of one of its members in World War II. The church reached its highest membership in 1924, when 80 names were on the roll. In the 1940s, it began to decline: with very few exceptions, the church suffered a net loss in membership every year after 1943, and it suffered through several periods in which there was no pastor. By early 1961, only nine members remained, and there was no pastor, as the final pastor had resigned in the previous spring. Ultimately, the Stafford Reformed Presbyterian Church was closed on November 9, 1961. The building was sold for $1,500 at some point in late 1960 or early 1961. After serving as the house of worship for the Bible Missionary Church, it was purchased by Henderson House Bed and Breakfast in 2001.

== See also ==
- National Register of Historic Places listings in Kansas
