= First United Methodist Church (Des Moines, Iowa) =

- First Methodist Episcopal Church
- U.S. National Register of Historic Places
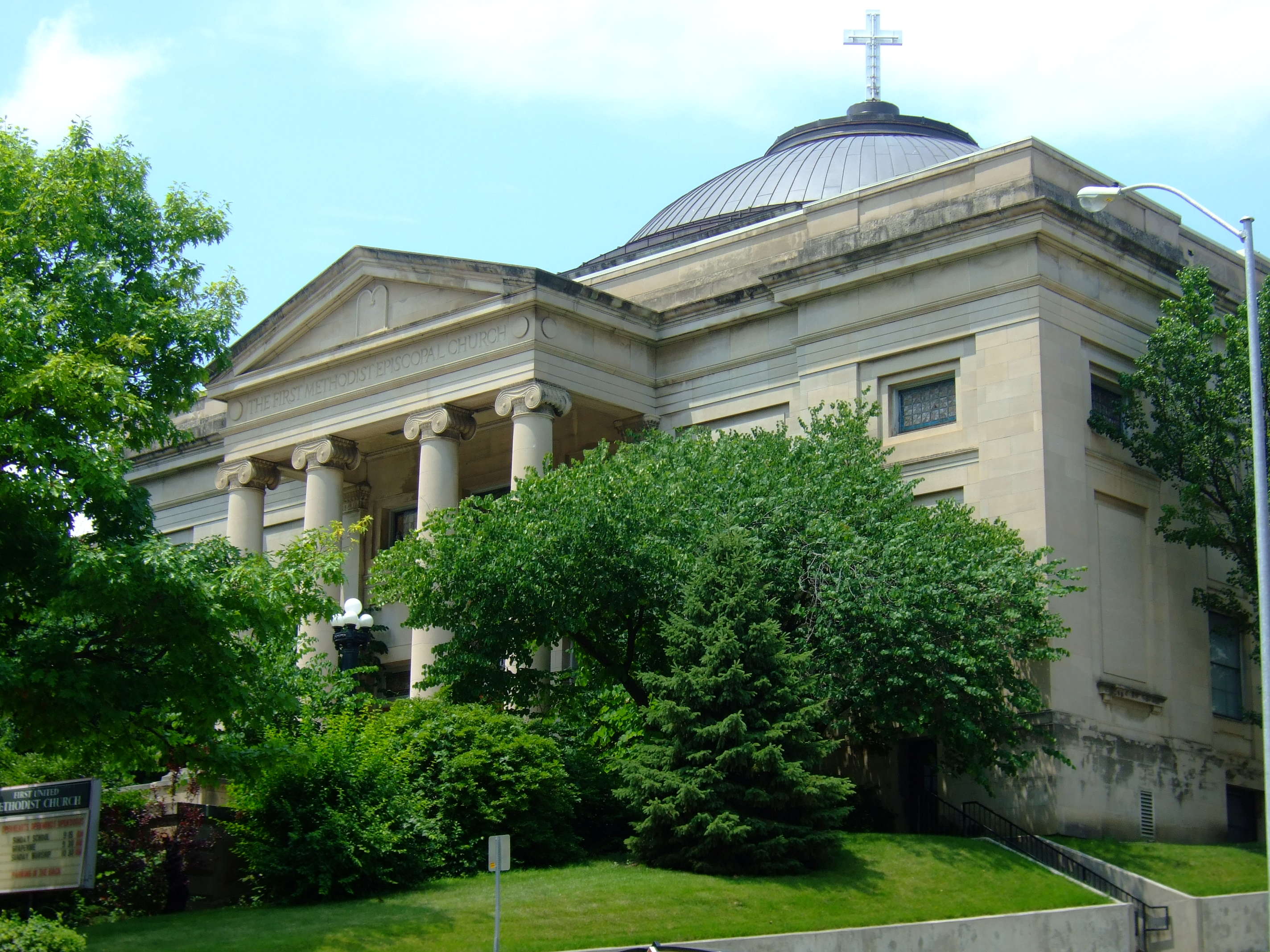

- Location within Iowa Location within the United States
- Location: 10th and Pleasant Sts. Des Moines, Iowa
- Coordinates: 41°35′21.3″N 93°37′52.1″W
- Area: less than one acre
- Built: 1908
- Architect: Proudfoot & Bird
- Architectural style: Classical Revival
- NRHP reference No.: 84001295
- Added to NRHP: April 12, 1984

First United Methodist Church is located in downtown Des Moines, Iowa, United States. It has been listed on the National Register of Historic Places since 1984 as First Methodist Episcopal Church, which is its original name.

== History ==
The congregation was organized through a series of Bible Study meetings that were held in Rathburn Cabin in 1845. Early church services were also held in cabins in the early years. The first church building for the congregation was constructed in 1848 on Fifth Street, south of Walnut, and a larger brick structure was built on the same site in 1856. Four years later the congregation lost ownership of the building and had to rent the basement of the building for three years while the main sanctuary was used as a public hall for concerts, lectures, and the like. Centenary Methodist Episcopal Church and First Church merged in 1880, leaving First as the only downtown Methodist congregation. The congregation dedicated a new church on Ninth Street in 1881.

By 1906 the congregation numbered a thousand members even after it had founded 11 other Methodist congregations in the city. The groundbreaking for the present church was begun in 1905, and the cornerstone was laid during a ceremony on July 21, 1906. The church building was dedicated on June 14, 1908. A major restoration of the building was completed in 1940 with a new chancel and altar, rose window, a new pew arrangement, and a renewal of the pipe organ. The education wing was built in 1954. A new Reuter organ was added in 1962-1963 as was the marble backdrop and the Celtic Cross. In 1980 a historical mural was dedicated in the west balcony. The dome and the sanctuary were renovated in 2007.

The congregation went through two name changes in its history. In 1939 it became First Methodist after the Methodist Episcopal Church, Methodist Episcopal Church, South, and the Methodist Protestant Church merged to form the Methodist Church. In 1968 another change to First United Methodist Church occurred when the Methodist Church merged with the Evangelical United Brethren Church.

== Architecture ==
The congregation hired the prominent Des Moines architectural firm of Proudfoot & Bird to design the present church. Because the estimated cost of $175,000 was too high, some of the decorative details of the planned church were not executed. The Neoclassical-style building features a symmetrical plan in monumental proportions, a large pedimented portico supported by Ionic columns, plain exterior surfaces of Bedford stone, and a Roman glass and copper dome that is capped by a Latin cross. The building's proportions are said to match those of the Pantheon in Rome.

== Pipe organ ==
The church's pipe organ is Reuter Organ Company Opus 1412 installed in 1963. It is located in chambers on the sides of the sanctuary with no visible pipes. The instrument has a traditional style console in a fixed position, and it has a roll top. It features electro-pneumatic chests, three manuals, four divisions, 62 stops, 50 registers, 62 ranks, and 3,435 pipes. The manual compass is 61 notes, while the pedal compass is 32 notes. The drawknobs are in vertical rows on angled jambs. The balanced swell shoes/pedals are standard AGO placement. Rounding out the features are adjustable combination pistons, AGO Standard (concave radiating) pedalboard, reversible full organ/tutti thumb piston, reversible full organ/tutti toe stud, combination action toe studs, coupler reversible thumb pistons, and coupler reversible toe studs.

Stop list:

GREAT

- 16' Sub Principal 61
- 8' Principal 61
- 8' Bourdon 61
- 4' Octave 61
- 4' Spillflöte 61
- 2' Fifteenth 61
- IV Fourniture 244
- III Scharf 183
- 16' Dulzian PO
- 8' Trumpet 61
  - Sub
  - Unison off
  - Super
- 8' Fanfare Trumpet 61 a
  - Chimes

POSITIV

- 8' Copula 61
- 8' Salicional 61 b
- 8' Flauto Dolce 61 b
- 8' Flute Celeste 54 b
- 4' Principal 61
- 4' Koppelflöte 61
- 4' Cor de Nuit 61 b
- 2' Principal 61
- 1 1/3' Larigot 61
- 1' Sifflöte 61
- III Cymbale 183
- 16' Dulzian 61
- 8' Krummhorn 61
- 8' Baryton 61 b
- 4' Regal 61
  - Tremolo
  - Unison Off
- 16' Fanfare Trumpet tc
- 8' Fanfare Trumpet GT
- 4' Fanfare Trumpet GT

SWELL

- 16' Sub Principal 61
- 8' Principal 61
- 8' Bourdon 61
- 4' Octave 61
- 4' Spillflöte 61
- 2' Fifteenth 61
- IV Fourniture 244
- III Scharf 183
- 16' Dulzian PO
- 8' Trumpet 61
  - Sub
  - Unison off
  - Super
- 8' Fanfare Trumpet 61 a
- Chimes

PEDAL

- 32' Acoustic Bourdon --
- 16' Principal 32
- 16' Bourdon 32
- 16' Sub Principal GT
- 16' Lieblichbordun SW
- 8' Octave 32
- 8' Gedeckt 32
- 8' Sub Principal GT
- 8' Flauto Dolce SW
- 4' Choralbass 32
- 4' Coppel 32
- 2' Waldflöte 32
- II Sesquialter 64
- III Mixtur 96
- 16' Bombarde 32
- 16' Dulzian PO
- 8' Bombarde 12
- 8' Dulzian PO
- 4' Schalmei 32
- 4' Dulzian PO

== Charity work ==
In 1992, First United Methodist Church joined with seven other churches in the Des Moines area and created the Churches United Shelter (now the Central Iowa Shelter), to combat homelessness in the area.
