= First Methodist Episcopal Church (Kensett, Iowa) =

- U.S. National Register of Historic Places
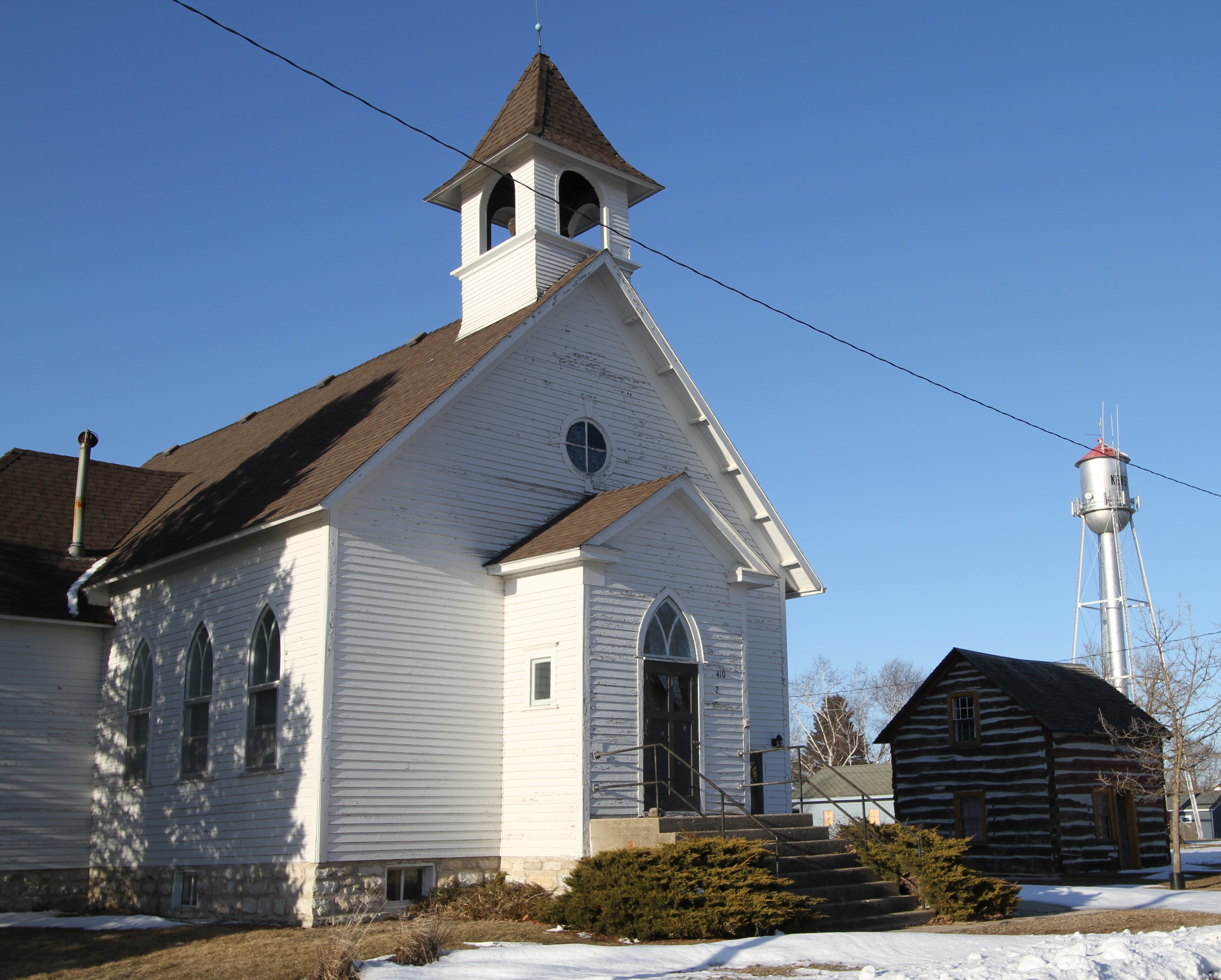

- Location within Iowa Location within the United States
- Location: 401 2nd. St. Kensett, Iowa
- Coordinates: 43°21′7″N 93°12′40″W
- Area: less than one acre
- Built: 1899
- Architect: F.W. Kinney
- Architectural style: Gothic Revival
- NRHP reference No.: 00000985
- Added to NRHP: August 16, 2000

First Methodist Episcopal Church, also known as Kensett United Methodist Church, is a historic church building located in Kensett, Iowa, United States. The church was designed by local architect F.W. Kinney and built by local builders. The frame structure was completed in 1899 in the Gothic Revival style. The interior walls and ceiling are covered with a pressed decorative metal. On top of the gable roof above the main facade is a small belfry. Circular windows are located on both ends of the church. A small polygonal apse is located on the far end, and wings are located on both sides of the structure. It was founded by an English speaking congregation as opposed to the many Norwegian Protestant congregations in and around Kensett. The church was added to the National Register of Historic Places in 2000.
