= First Methodist Episcopal Church (Fellsmere, Florida) =

Historic church in Florida, United States

- U.S. National Register of Historic Places
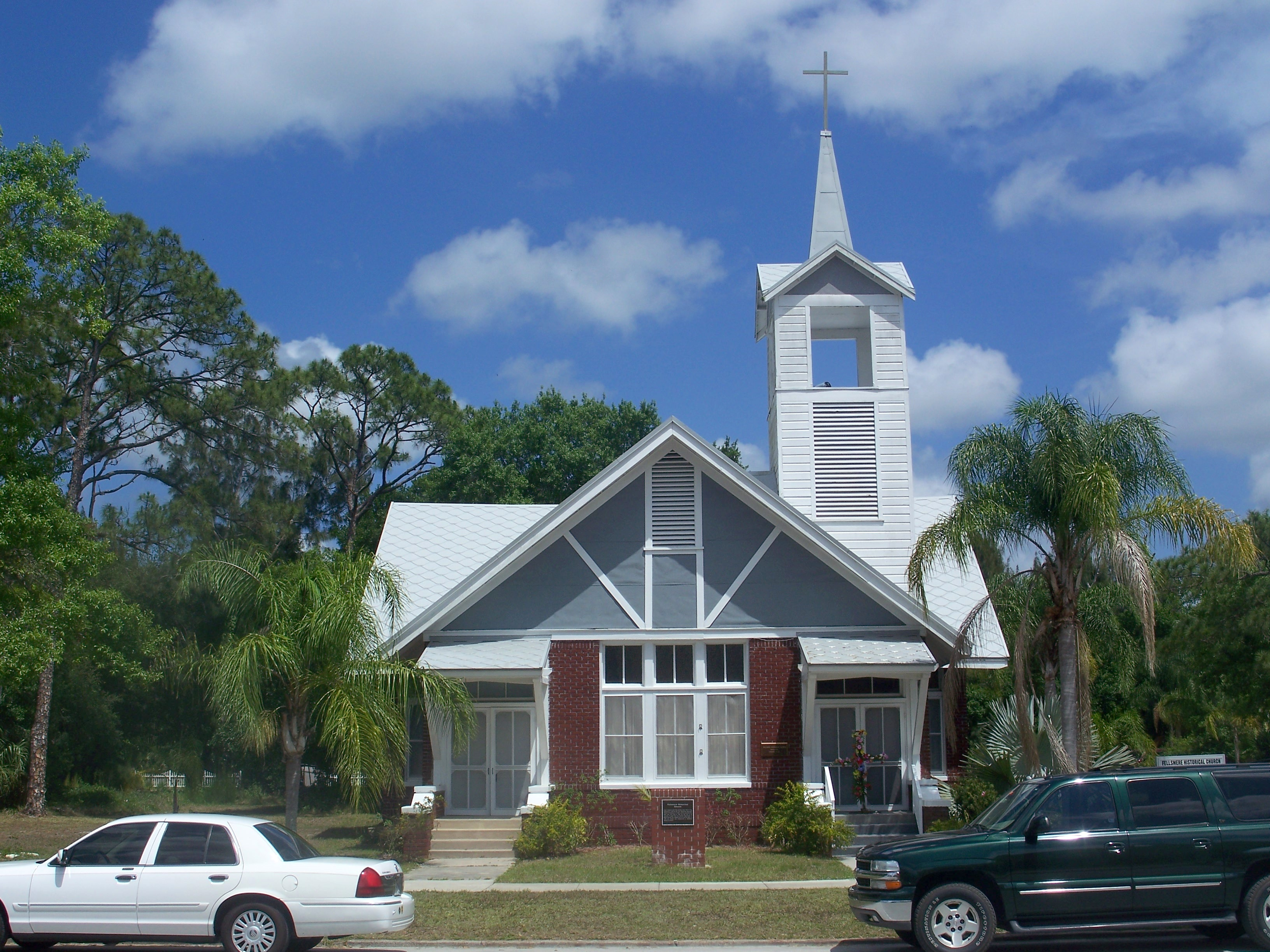

- Location within Florida Location within the United States
- Location: 39 North Broadway, Fellsmere, Florida
- Coordinates: 27°46′8″N 80°36′4″W
- Built: 1924
- Built by: Corydon E. Nourse
- Architectural style: Bungalow/Craftsman
- NRHP reference No.: 96001521
- Added to NRHP: December 27, 1996

The First Methodist Episcopal Church is a historic church in Fellsmere, Florida. It is located at 39 North Broadway Street. It was built in 1924 by local contractor Corydon E. Nourse. In 1996, it was added to the U.S. National Register of Historic Places.
