= Stafford First United Methodist Church =

Historic church in Kansas, United States

- First Methodist Episcopal Church
- U.S. National Register of Historic Places
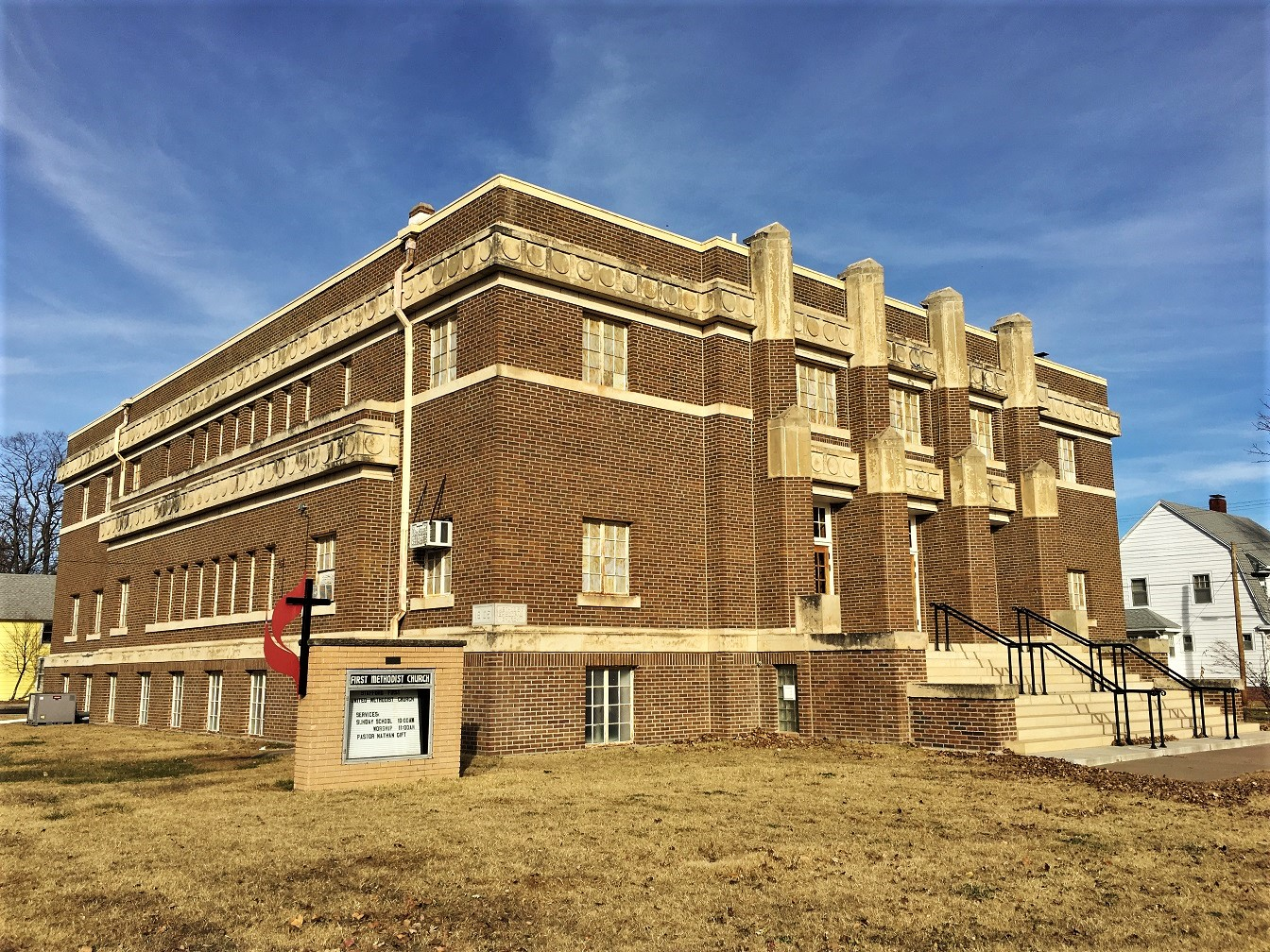

- Location within Kansas Location within the United States
- Location: 219 W. Stafford; Stafford, Kansas
- Coordinates: 37°57′49″N 98°36′9″W
- Area: less than one acre
- Built: 1927
- Architect: Don Buel Schuler
- Architectural style: Late 19th and Early 20th Century American Movements, English Collegiate Gothic
- NRHP reference No.: 02001264
- Added to NRHP: October 31, 2002

Stafford First United Methodist Church is a historic church in Stafford, Kansas. The building was designed by architect Don Buel Schuler (1888–1972). It was built in 1927 and was added to the National Register in 2002 as the First Methodist Episcopal Church.
