= First Methodist Episcopal Church (Windsor, Colorado) =

Historic church in Colorado, United States

- U.S. National Register of Historic Places
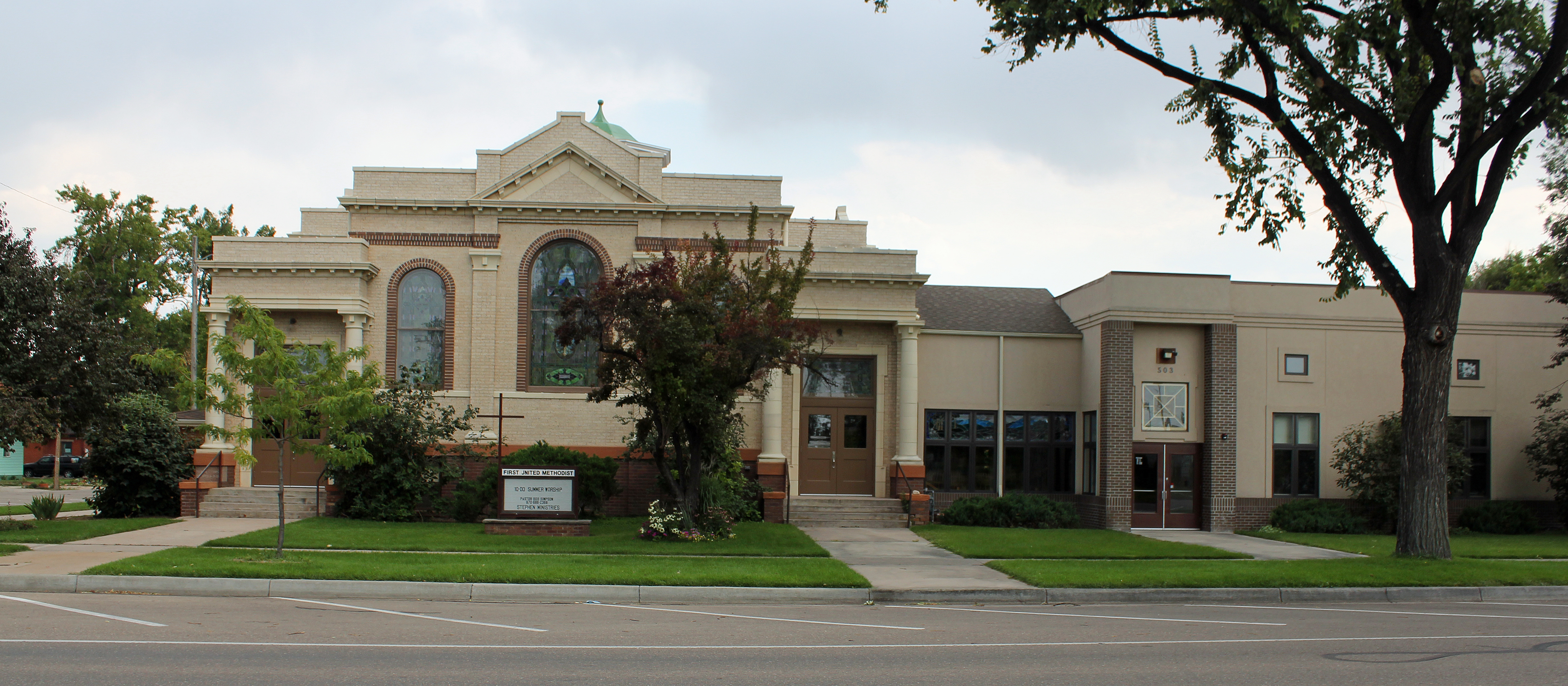

- Location within Colorado Location within the United States
- Location: 503 Walnut St., Windsor, Colorado
- Coordinates: 40°28′42″N 104°54′14″W
- Area: less than one acre
- Built: 1915
- Built by: Richard J. Welton
- Architect: John R. Smith
- Architectural style: Classical Revival
- NRHP reference No.: 04000660
- Added to NRHP: July 7, 2004

The First Methodist Episcopal Church (First United Methodist Church) at 503 Walnut Street in Windsor, Colorado, United States, is a historic church built in 1915. It was added to the National Register in 2004.

== Size ==
It features Classical Revival with a 52 by 72 feet (16 m × 22 m) plan. A Postmodern addition, with a 52 by 100 feet (16 m × 30 m) plan, was constructed in 1995 and connected to the original 1915 structure by an enclosed 14 by 21 feet (4.3 m × 6.4 m) walkway.
