= Trick or Treat (1986 film) =

1986 film by Charles Martin Smith

- Theatrical release poster
- Directed by: Charles Martin Smith
- Screenplay by: Joel Soisson; Michael S. Murphey; Rhet Topham
- Story by: Rhet Topham
- Produced by: Michael S. Murphey; Joel Soisson
- Starring: Marc Price; Tony Fields; Lisa Orgolini
- Cinematography: Robert Elswit
- Edited by: Jane Schwartz Jaffe
- Music by: Fastway (Note: "Music composed and performed by"); Christopher Young (Note: "Music score by")
- Distributed by: De Laurentiis Entertainment Group
- Release date: October 24, 1986
- Running time: 97 minutes
- Country: United States
- Language: English
- Budget: $3.5 million
- Box office: $6.8 million

Trick or Treat (Note: Foreign markets released the film as Ragman or Death at 33 RPM) is a 1986 American supernatural horror film directed by Charles Martin Smith in his directorial debut, and produced and released by De Laurentiis Entertainment Group. It stars Marc Price and Tony Fields, with special appearances by Gene Simmons and Ozzy Osbourne in his film debut. The plot centers on an outcast metalhead teenager who is haunted by the ghost of his rock hero.

It was released on October 24, 1986. Despite receiving initially middling reviews, Trick or Treat has developed a cult following.

== Plot ==
Eddie "Ragman" Weinbauer is a teenage outcast at Lakeridge High School who, due to his eccentric lifestyle and appearance, suffers bullying by his jock schoolmates, led by Tim Hainey. A heavy metal music fan, Eddie worships Sammi Curr, an infamous rock superstar and Lakeridge High alumnus, whose vulgar antics earned him a ban from returning to perform at the school's Halloween ball. Upon learning of Curr's death in a mysterious hotel fire, a distraught Eddie seeks comfort from his friend Nuke, a radio DJ and former classmate of Curr's. Nuke hands Eddie the master of Curr's last and as-yet unreleased album Songs in the Key of Death on an acetate disc, which he has copied to reel-to-reel tape so he can play it in its entirety on-air at midnight on Halloween, as per Sammi's will.

Once back home, having previous experience with hidden messages in his records, Eddie plays Sammi's album backwards and hears Sammi's voice addressing him personally. Speaking to Eddie through the record, Sammi's ghost instructs Eddie to pose as bait for a revenge plot against Eddie's bullies, thus also avenging Sammi for the abuse he himself endured in his youth. At first the revenge is innocent enough and helps build Eddie's confidence, but before long, Sammi's ploy becomes sinister and life-threatening, prompting Eddie to rescind their pact. After Sammi designates Eddie's and Tim's shared love interest Leslie as his next target, Eddie attempts to stop Sammi by smashing the record and his own sound system. Before he can do so, Sammi, having acquired sufficient energy, materializes into the real world and berates Eddie, then he escapes by teleporting via sound systems and radio signals.

Eddie recruits his friend Roger to retrieve and destroy a cassette tape copy of the album he had left in Tim's car. Roger steals the tape but, skeptical of Eddie's motives, plays it on his own stereo system instead of destroying it. This summons Sammi, who orders Roger to play the tape of Songs in the Key of Death at the Halloween ball under threat of his life. That night, Roger does as told and plays the tape over the PA system. As a local live band prepares to play, Sammi appears and summarily replaces their singer, proceeding to play his music to a delighted crowd that mistakes him for an impersonator of Sammi. Sammi soon starts disintegrating audience members by firing electric bolts from the neck of his guitar, wreaking havoc as the attendees begin fleeing the venue in terror.

Having heard Sammi's music over a phone call from Leslie, Eddie drives to the school ballroom to find that Leslie is still inside. As Eddie rushes to save Leslie, he runs into an angered Tim, who is killed by Sammi before Eddie can save him. Roger buys Eddie and Leslie time by cutting the school power and temporarily stopping Sammi. As an automated playback of Nuke's recorded voice announces the midnight broadcast of Sammi's album, Eddie and Leslie rush to the radio station and evade Sammi's attacks, whereupon they realize Sammi's electrified body is vulnerable to water. While Leslie remains at the radio station, Eddie speeds away in a stolen police car, taunting Sammi through a radio and luring him into appearing behind the car's security grill. Right as Leslie destroys the last remaining reels of Sammi's album, cutting off his escape, Eddie speeds over the edge of an unfinished bridge, launching the car into a river and destroying the malevolent rocker for good.

== Cast ==
- Marc Price as Eddie Weinbauer
- Tony Fields as Sammi Curr
- Lisa Orgolini as Leslie Graham
- Doug Savant as Tim Hainey
- Elaine Joyce as Angie Weinbauer, Eddie's Mother
- Glen Morgan as Roger Mockus
- Clare Torao as Maggie Wong-Hernandez (as Clare Nono)
- Gene Simmons as Nuke
- Ozzy Osbourne as Rev. Aaron Gilstrom
- Alice Nunn as Mrs. Sylvia Cavell (cameo)
- Charles Martin Smith as Mr. Wimbley (cameo)

== Production ==
Blackie Lawless of W.A.S.P. was originally set to play Sammi Curr. Ozzy Osbourne plays a televangelist decrying the evils of heavy metal music.

Special effects for the film were created by Kevin Yagher. Yagher also has a cameo in the movie as the lead singer/guitarist for the band The Kickers, playing at the high school Halloween dance.

Scenes at Eddie's school (the fictional Lakeridge High School) were filmed at both Hoggard High School and New Hanover High School in Wilmington, North Carolina.

Keanu Reeves auditioned for the role of Eddie Weinbauer, but Marc Price was ultimately cast. Gene Simmons originally was offered the role of Sammi Curr, but did not think much of the script and ultimately agreed only to a cameo as radio DJ Nuke. Simmons later said in an interview that he chose to play the role as Wolfman Jack, a childhood hero of his.

The title of Sammi Curr's unreleased album Songs in the Key of Death is a play on the title of Stevie Wonder's 1976 album Songs in the Key of Life.

Glen Morgan and James Wong provided uncredited rewrites for the film.

== Soundtrack ==
All Sammi Curr music was composed and performed by the band Fastway. Meanwhile, Christopher Young composed the film score.

== Release ==
Trick or Treat was released theatrically in the United States by De Laurentiis Entertainment Group on October 24, 1986. It grossed $6,797,218 at the box office. It was released on VHS by Lorimar Home Video the following year.

The film was released on DVD in the United States by Platinum Disc Corporation in 2002. In 2014, a three-disc collector's edition of Trick or Treat—containing an all-region Blu-ray disc, region 2 DVD, soundtrack CD, and booklet in digibook packaging—was released in Germany by NSM Records. This edition was limited to 1,500 copies—1,000 copies with cover art A and 500 copies with cover art B.

== Reception ==
On the review aggregator website Rotten Tomatoes, 70% of 10 critics' reviews are positive. Metacritic, which uses a weighted average, assigned the film a score of 57 out of 100, based on 9 critics, indicating "mixed or average" reviews.

== See also ==
- List of ghost films
- List of films set around Halloween
