= First Methodist Episcopal Church (Montclair, New Jersey) =

Historic church in New Jersey, United States

- U.S. National Register of Historic Places
- New Jersey Register of Historic Places
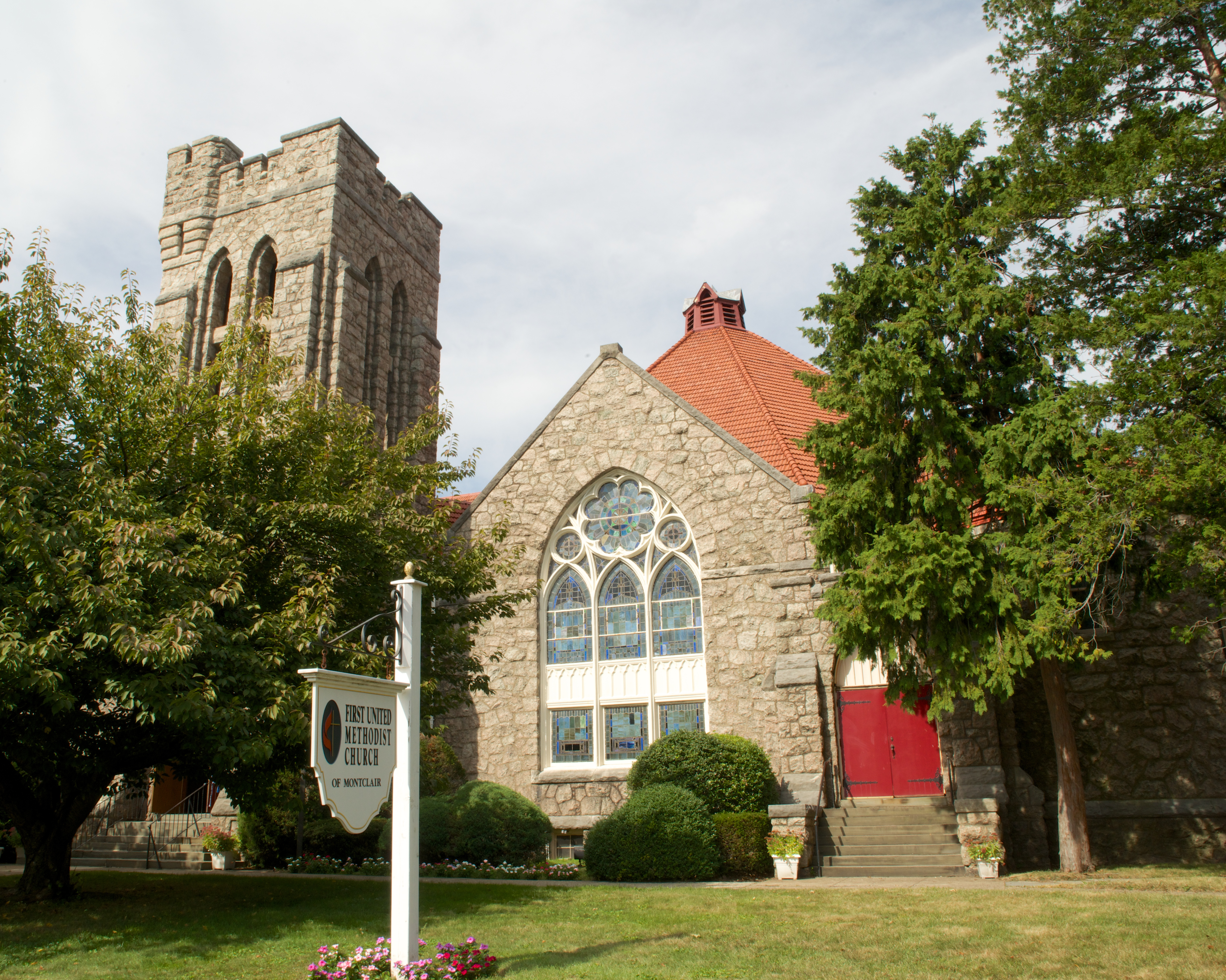

- Location within Essex County, New Jersey Location within New Jersey Location within the United States
- Location: 24 N. Fullerton Avenue, Montclair, New Jersey
- Coordinates: 40°48′55″N 74°13′6″W
- Area: 1.5 acres (0.61 ha)
- Built: 1902
- Architects: Van Vleck & Goldsmith
- Architectural style: Late Gothic Revival
- MPS: Montclair MRA
- NRHP reference No.: 86003048
- NJRHP No.
- Added to NRHP: July 01, 1988

First Methodist Episcopal Church is a historic church at 24 N. Fullerton Avenue in Montclair, Essex County, New Jersey, United States.

It was built in 1902 and added to the National Register of Historic Places in 1988.

== See also ==
- National Register of Historic Places listings in Essex County, New Jersey
