= First Methodist Episcopal Church (Massillon, Ohio) =

Historic church in Ohio, United States

- U.S. National Register of Historic Places
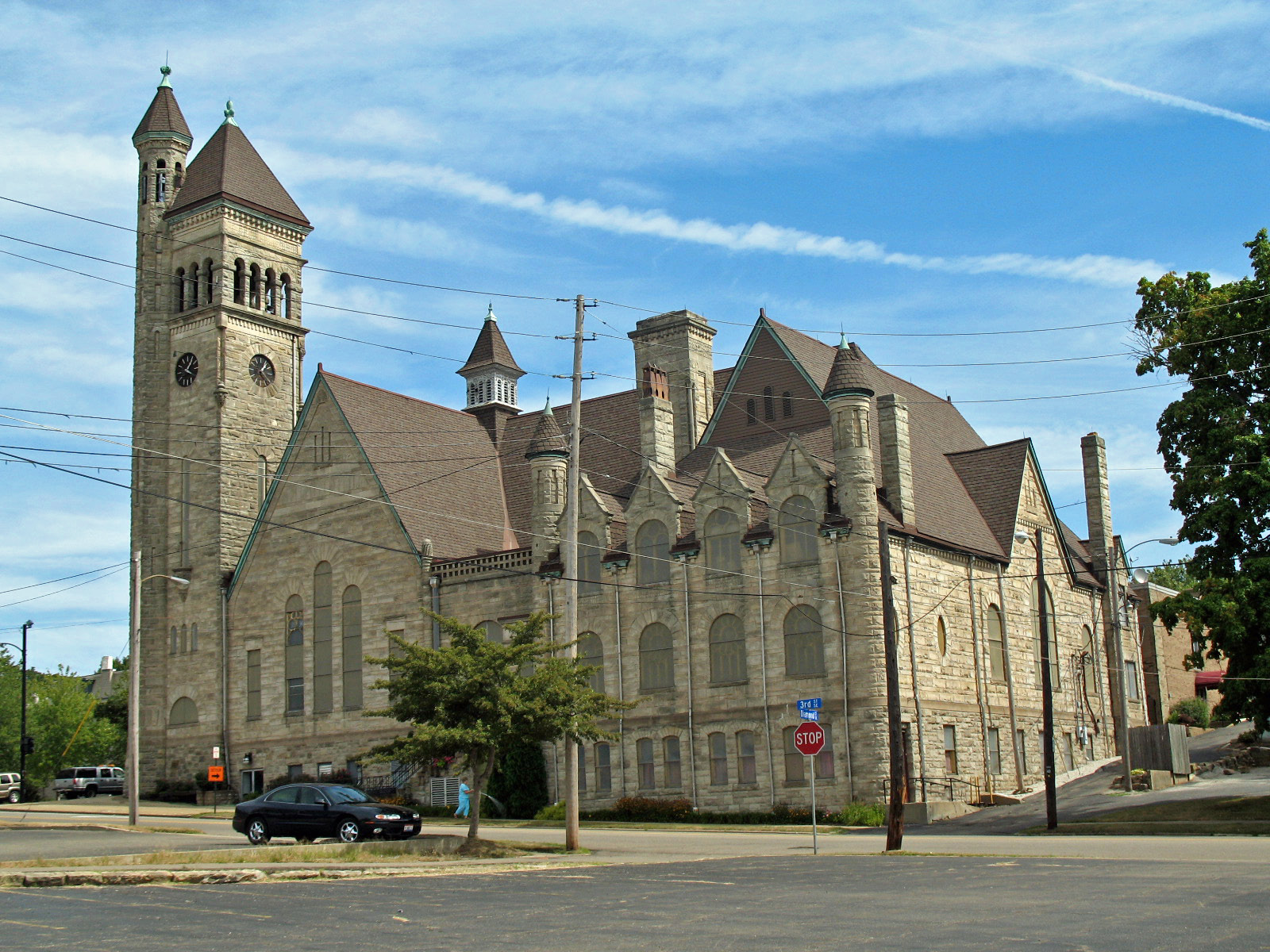

- Location within Ohio Location within the United States
- Location: 301 Lincoln Way East; Massillon, Ohio; United States
- Coordinates: 40°47′50.1″N 81°31′8.9″W
- Built: June 1895
- Architect: Philip & Walker; James P. Bailey
- Architectural style: Richardsonian Romanesque
- NRHP reference No.: 85001803
- Added to NRHP: 1985-08-22

First Methodist Episcopal Church (now known as First United Methodist Church) is a historic church in Massillon, Ohio, United States, located at 301 Lincoln Way East. It is of stone and sandstone construction with a copper roof in the Richardsonian Romanesque style. The building was dedicated in June 1895 and was added to the U.S. National Register of Historic Places on August 22, 1985.
