= Farmers Bank Building =

Farmers Bank Building may refer to:

- Farmers Bank Building (Leslie, Arkansas), listed on the NRHP in Arkansas
- Farmers Bank Building (Norborne, Missouri), listed on the NRHP in Missouri
- Farmers Bank Building (Pittsburgh, Pennsylvania), a former skyscraper
