= First Methodist Episcopal Church (Monte Vista, Colorado) =

Historic church in Colorado, United States

- U.S. National Register of Historic Places
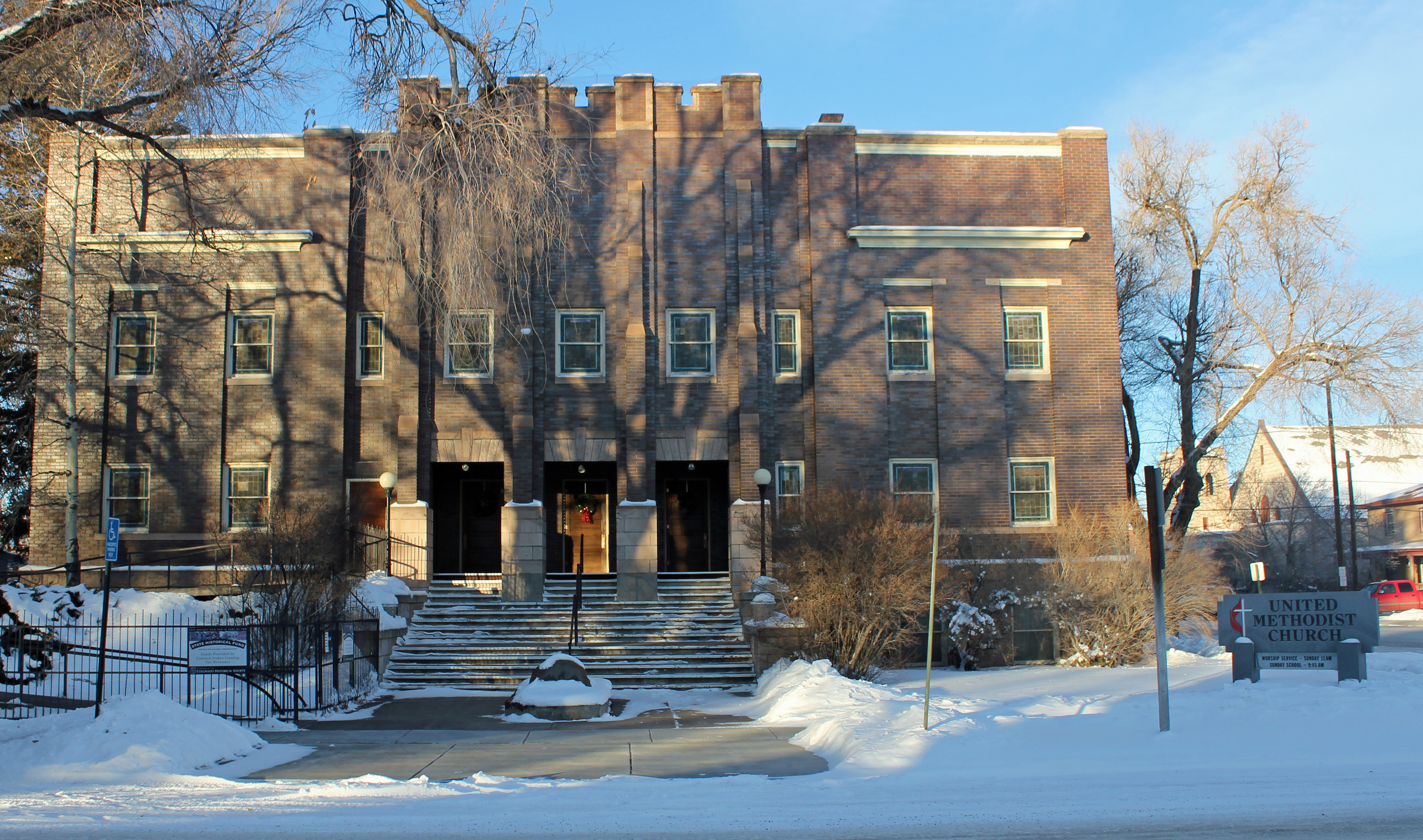

- Location within Colorado Location within the United States
- Location: 215 Washington St., Monte Vista, Colorado
- Coordinates: 37.5790°N 106.1483°W
- Area: less than one acre
- Built: 1922
- Architect: Charles J. Anderson
- Architectural style: Prairie School, Queen Anne
- NRHP reference No.: 03001011
- Added to NRHP: November 10, 2003

First Methodist Episcopal Church (First Methodist Episcopal Church, South; Trinity Methodist Church) is a historic church at 215 Washington Street in Monte Vista, Colorado.

It was built beginning in 1922 and was added to the National Register of Historic Places in 2003. It is 78 by 86.5 feet (23.8 m × 26.4 m) in plan. The listing includes a parsonage built in 1901.
