= Stafford, Kansas =

City in Stafford County, Kansas

- City
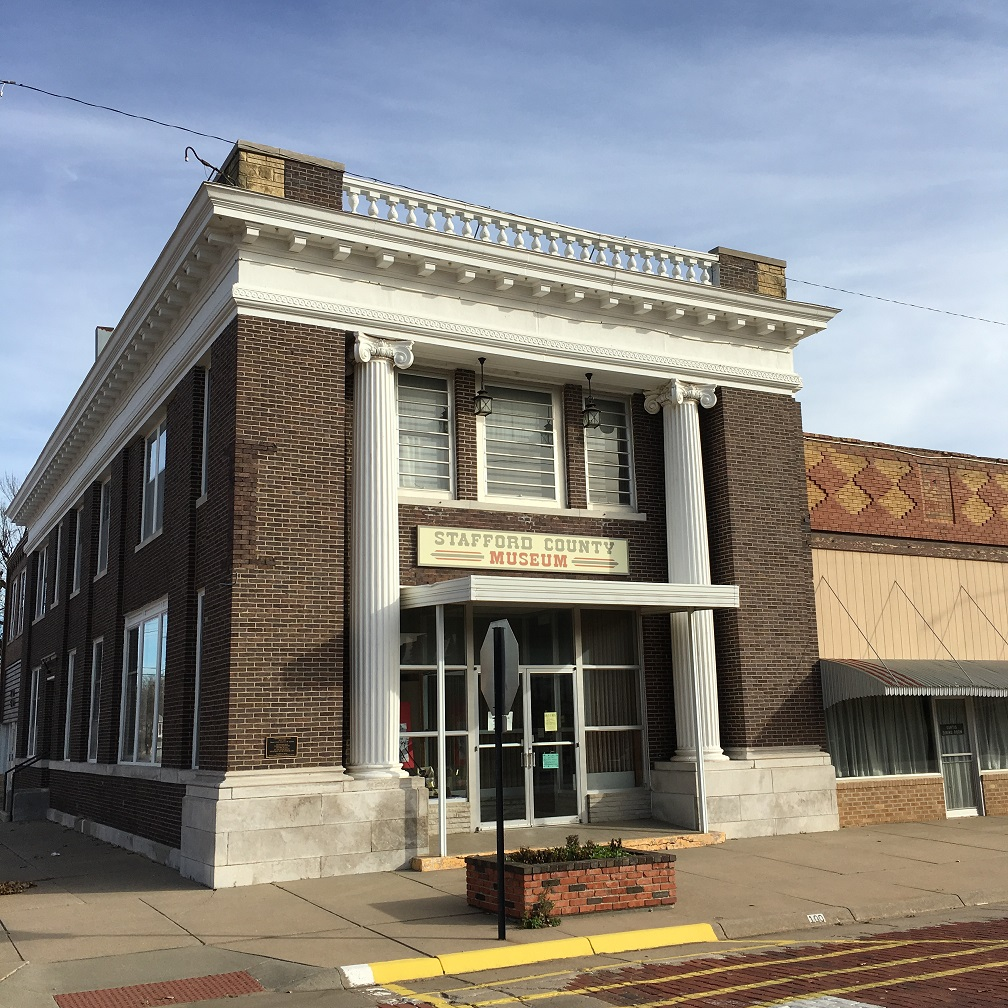
- Stafford County Museum (2017)

- Location within Stafford County and Kansas

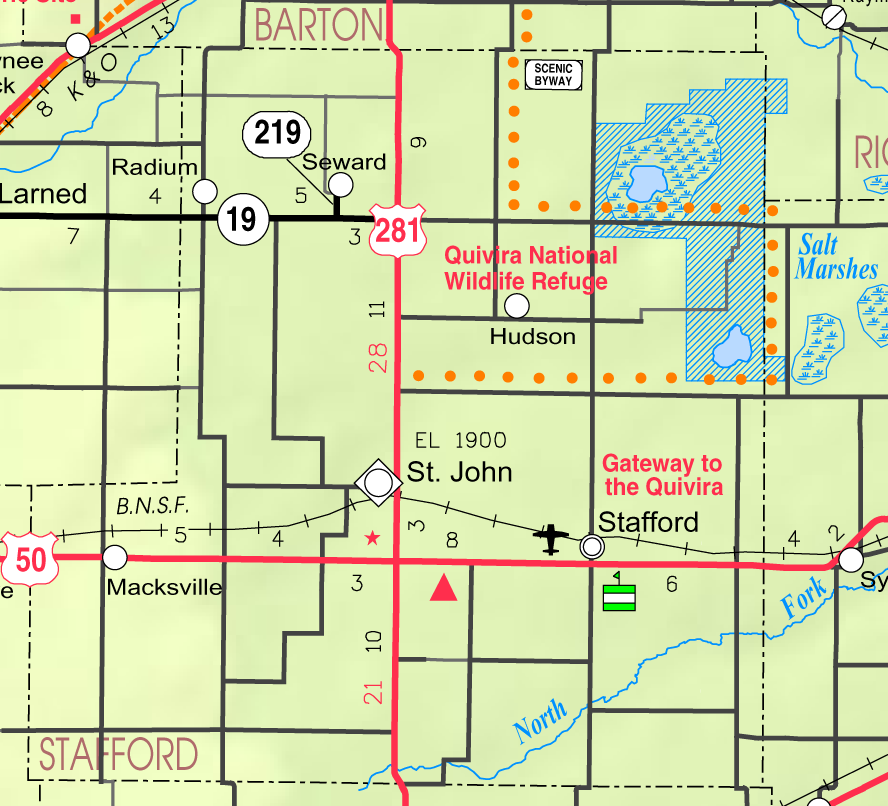
- KDOT map of Stafford County (legend)
- Coordinates: 37°57′45″N 98°35′58″W
- Country: United States
- State: Kansas
- County: Stafford
- Founded: 1878
- Incorporated: 1885
- Named for: Captain Lewis Stafford

Area
  - Total: 0.92 sq mi (2.37 km^{2})
  - Land: 0.92 sq mi (2.37 km^{2})
  - Water: 0 sq mi (0.00 km^{2})
- Elevation: 1,857 ft (566 m)

Population (2020)
  - Total: 959
  - Density: 1,050/sq mi (405/km^{2})
- Time zone: UTC-6 (CST)
  - Summer (DST): UTC-5 (CDT)
- ZIP Code: 67578
- Area code: 620
- FIPS code: 20-67775
- GNIS ID: 2395948
- Website: staffordkansas.com

Stafford is a city in Stafford County, Kansas, United States. As of the 2020 census, the population of the city was 959. It is located along Highway 50.

== History ==
Stafford was founded in 1878. As with Stafford County, the city was named for Lewis Stafford, a casualty in the Civil War. Stafford was destroyed by a tornado in 1882 and rebuilt within a year. Stafford was incorporated as a city in 1885.

The Atchison, Topeka and Santa Fe railroad depot, built in 1911, was slated to be demolished in late 2016 but was ultimately saved by a last-minute petition from the Stafford community.

== Geography ==
According to the United States Census Bureau, the city has a total area of 0.92 square miles (2.38 km^{2}), all of it land. It is approximately ninety-two miles northwest of Wichita on U.S. Route 50.

== Demographics ==
Historical population
Census	Pop.	Note	%±
1890	640		—
1900	1,068		66.9%
1910	1,927		80.4%
1920	1,752		−9.1%
1930	1,614		−7.9%
1940	2,011		24.6%
1950	2,005		−0.3%
1960	1,862		−7.1%
1970	1,414		−24.1%
1980	1,425		0.8%
1990	1,344		−5.7%
2000	1,161		−13.6%
2010	1,042		−10.2%
2020	959		−8.0%
U.S. Decennial Census

=== 2010 census ===
As of the census of 2010, there were 1,042 people, 487 households, and 262 families residing in the city. The population density was 1,132.6 inhabitants per square mile (437.3/km^{2}). There were 622 housing units at an average density of 676.1 per square mile (261.0/km^{2}). The racial makeup of the city was 94.3% White, 0.8% African American, 1.7% Native American, 0.1% Asian, 1.5% from other races, and 1.5% from two or more races. Hispanic or Latino of any race were 5.9% of the population.

There were 487 households, of which 23.4% had children under the age of 18 living with them, 41.9% were married couples living together, 7.4% had a female householder with no husband present, 4.5% had a male householder with no wife present, and 46.2% were non-families. 42.5% of all households were made up of individuals, and 24.1% had someone living alone who was 65 years of age or older. The average household size was 2.04 and the average family size was 2.76.

The median age in the city was 48.2 years. 21.4% of residents were under the age of 18; 6% were between the ages of 18 and 24; 18.5% were from 25 to 44; 27.4% were from 45 to 64; and 26.8% were 65 years of age or older. The gender makeup of the city was 46.8% male and 53.2% female.

=== 2000 census ===
As of the census of 2000, there were 1,161 people, 525 households, and 305 families residing in the city. The population density was 1,234.3 inhabitants per square mile (476.6/km^{2}). There were 640 housing units at an average density of 680.4 per square mile (262.7/km^{2}). The racial makeup of the city was 95.95% White, 0.09% African American, 0.86% Native American, 1.46% from other races, and 1.64% from two or more races. Hispanic or Latino of any race were 3.53% of the population.

There were 525 households, out of which 25.1% had children under the age of 18 living with them, 45.7% were married couples living together, 9.5% had a female householder with no husband present, and 41.9% were non-families. 39.4% of all households were made up of individuals, and 24.4% had someone living alone who was 65 years of age or older. The average household size was 2.12 and the average family size was 2.83.

In the city, the population was spread out, with 23.9% under the age of 18, 5.3% from 18 to 24, 20.4% from 25 to 44, 21.5% from 45 to 64, and 28.9% who were 65 years of age or older. The median age was 45 years. For every 100 females, there were 82.5 males. For every 100 females age 18 and over, there were 76.1 males.

The median income for a household in the city was $27,092, and the median income for a family was $32,383. Males had a median income of $26,307 versus $18,438 for females. The per capita income for the city was $16,032. About 11.2% of families and 16.4% of the population were below the poverty line, including 26.0% of those under age 18 and 9.6% of those age 65 or over.

== Education ==
The community is served by Stafford USD 349 public school district. All students in Stafford attend school in the same building. The district is rated 1A by the state; consequently, its teams play eight-man football.

== Notable people ==
- Neva Egan, American educator, former First Lady of Alaska (1959–1966, 1970–1974)
- Brett Fairchild, member of the Kansas House of Representatives
- Tony Fields, dancer, actor; best known as a Solid Gold dancer (1979–1984) and for his roles in A Chorus Line and Trick Or Treat.
- Norma Wendelburg (1918–2016), composer, pianist and academic

== Gallery ==
- Historic Images of Stafford, Special Photo Collections at Wichita State University Library
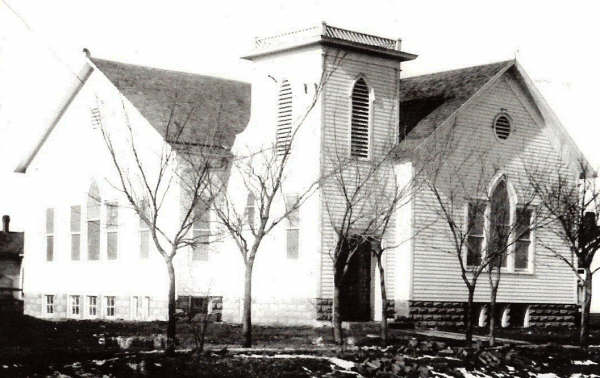
Stafford Reformed Presbyterian Church after its construction in 1913.

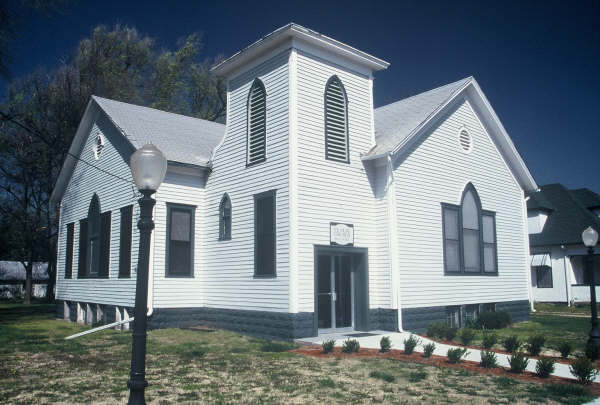
Stafford Reformed Presbyterian Church (NRHP), 2009.

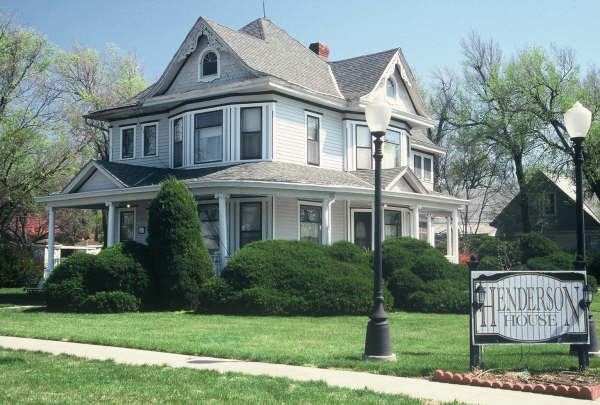
Sarah L. Henderson House (NRHP), 2009.

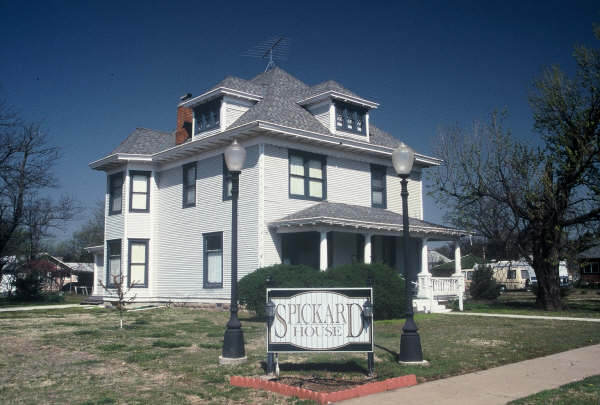
Joseph L. Spickard House, (NRHP), 2009.

== See also ==
- Stafford Reformed Presbyterian Church
- The Jones Store
- Quivira National Wildlife Refuge
