= First Methodist Episcopal Church, South (Ozark, Arkansas) =

Historic church in Arkansas, United States

- U.S. National Register of Historic Places
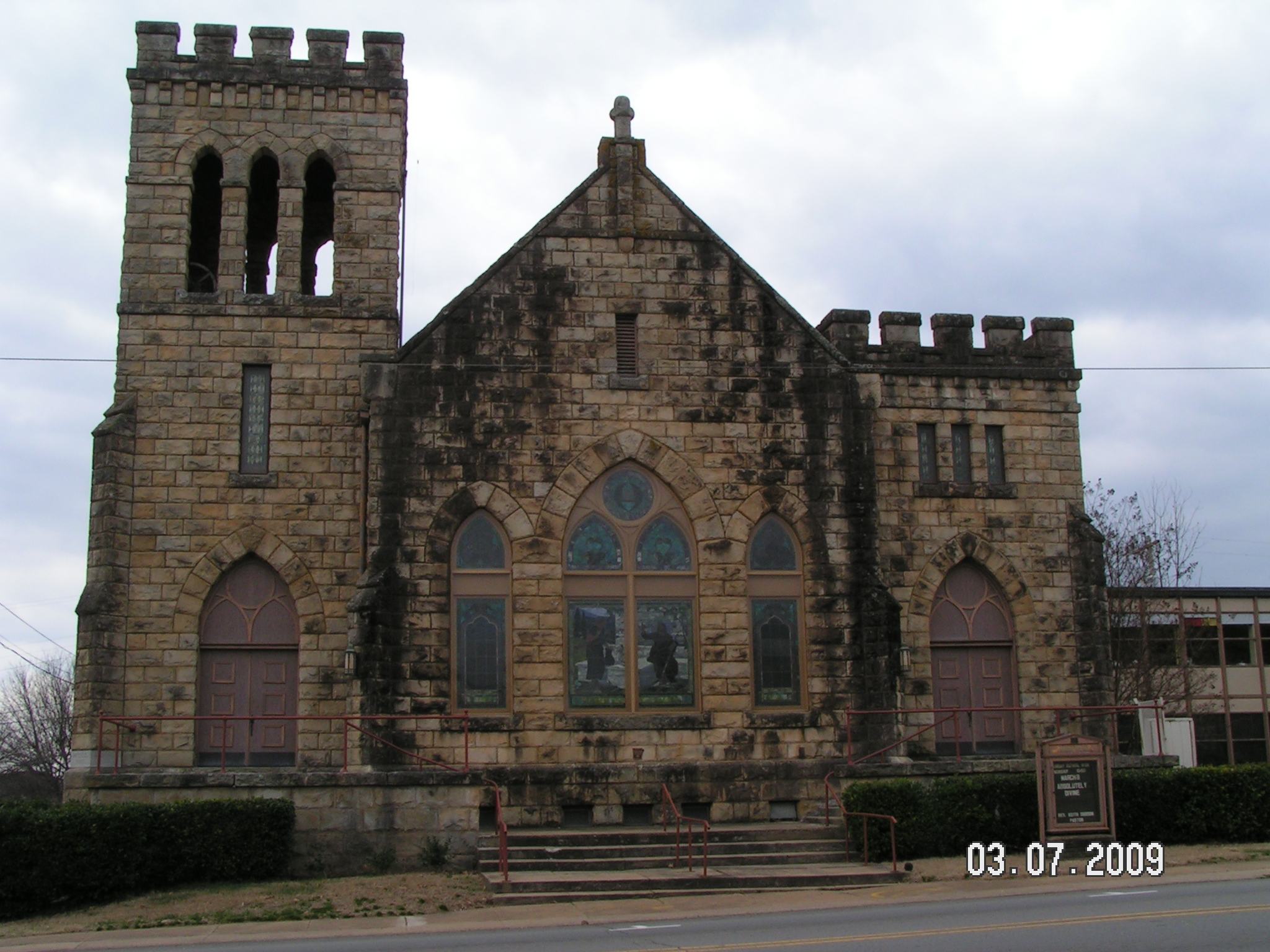

- Location within Arkansas Location within the United States
- Location: 503 W. Commercial St., Ozark, Arkansas
- Coordinates: 35°29′13″N 93°49′46″W
- Area: less than one acre
- Built: 1909
- Architect: Alonzo Klingensmith
- Architectural style: Late Gothic Revival
- NRHP reference No.: 92001154
- Added to NRHP: September 4, 1992

First Methodist Episcopal Church, South is a historic church at 503 West Commercial Street in Ozark, Arkansas. It is a 1 1/2-story stone structure, with a steeply pitched gable roof and a pair of square stone towers flanking the front-facing gable end. The taller left side tower has belfry stage with grouped round-arch openings on each side, and both towers have crenellated tops. The church was built in 1909 for a congregation organized in 1871. The architect was Alonzo Klingensmith of Fort Smith.

The building was listed on the National Register of Historic Places in 1992.

== See also ==
- National Register of Historic Places listings in Franklin County, Arkansas
