= First Methodist Episcopal Church and Parsonage (Williams, Arizona) =

Historic site in Coconino County, Arizona

- U.S. National Register of Historic Places
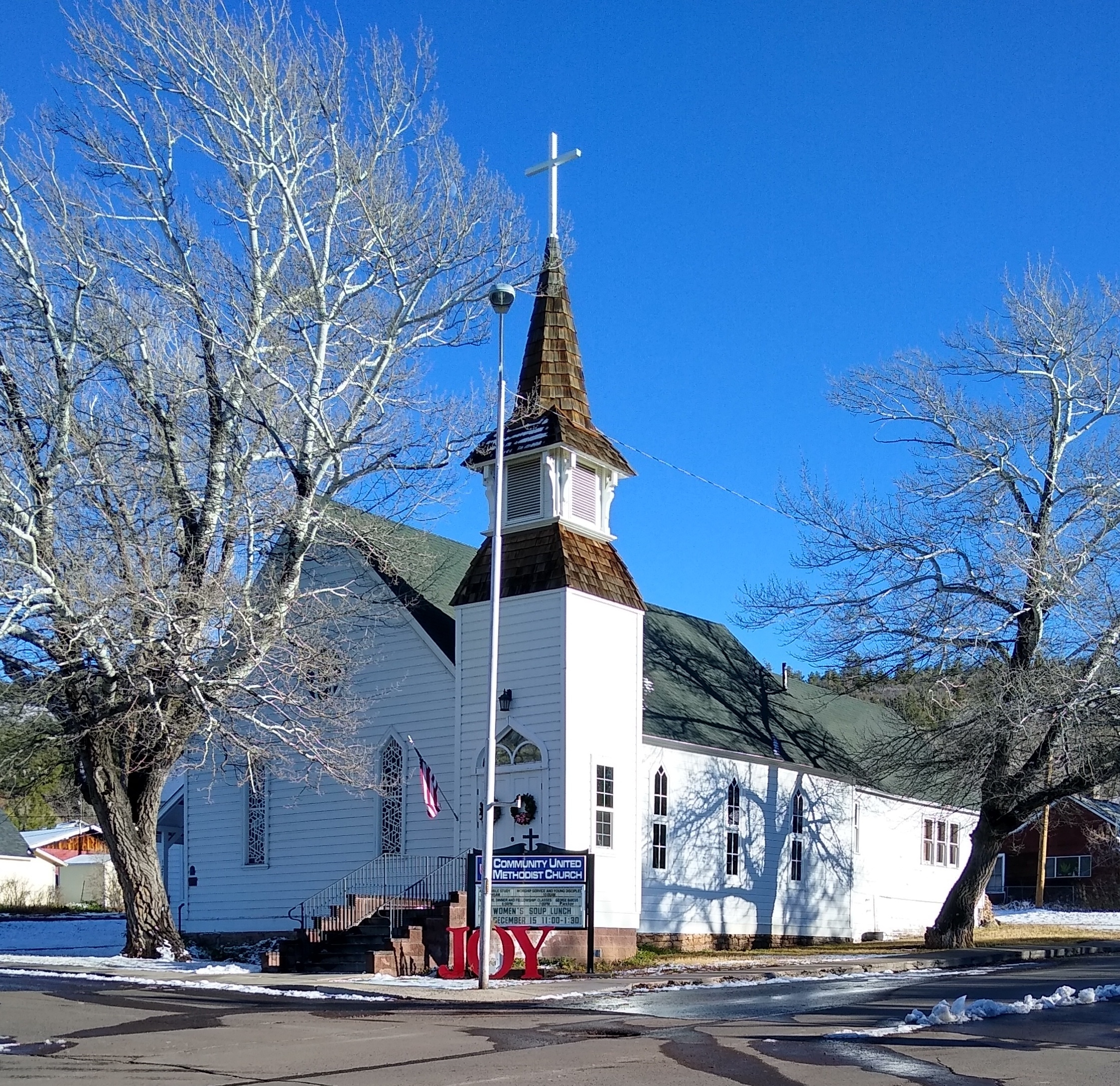

- Location within Arizona Location within the United States
- Location: 127 W. Sherman St., Williams, Arizona
- Coordinates: 35.24856°N 112.18714°W
- Area: less than one acre
- Built: 1891
- Architectural style: Gothic Revival
- NRHP reference No.: 84000403
- Added to NRHP: November 29, 1984

First Methodist Episcopal Church and Parsonage (Community United Methodist Church or Williams Methodist Church) is a historic church at 127 W. Sherman Street in Williams, Arizona, United States.

It was built in 1891 and added to the National Register in 1984.
