= First United Methodist Church (Humboldt, Tennessee) =

Historic church in Tennessee, United States

- First Methodist Episcopal Church, South
- U.S. National Register of Historic Places
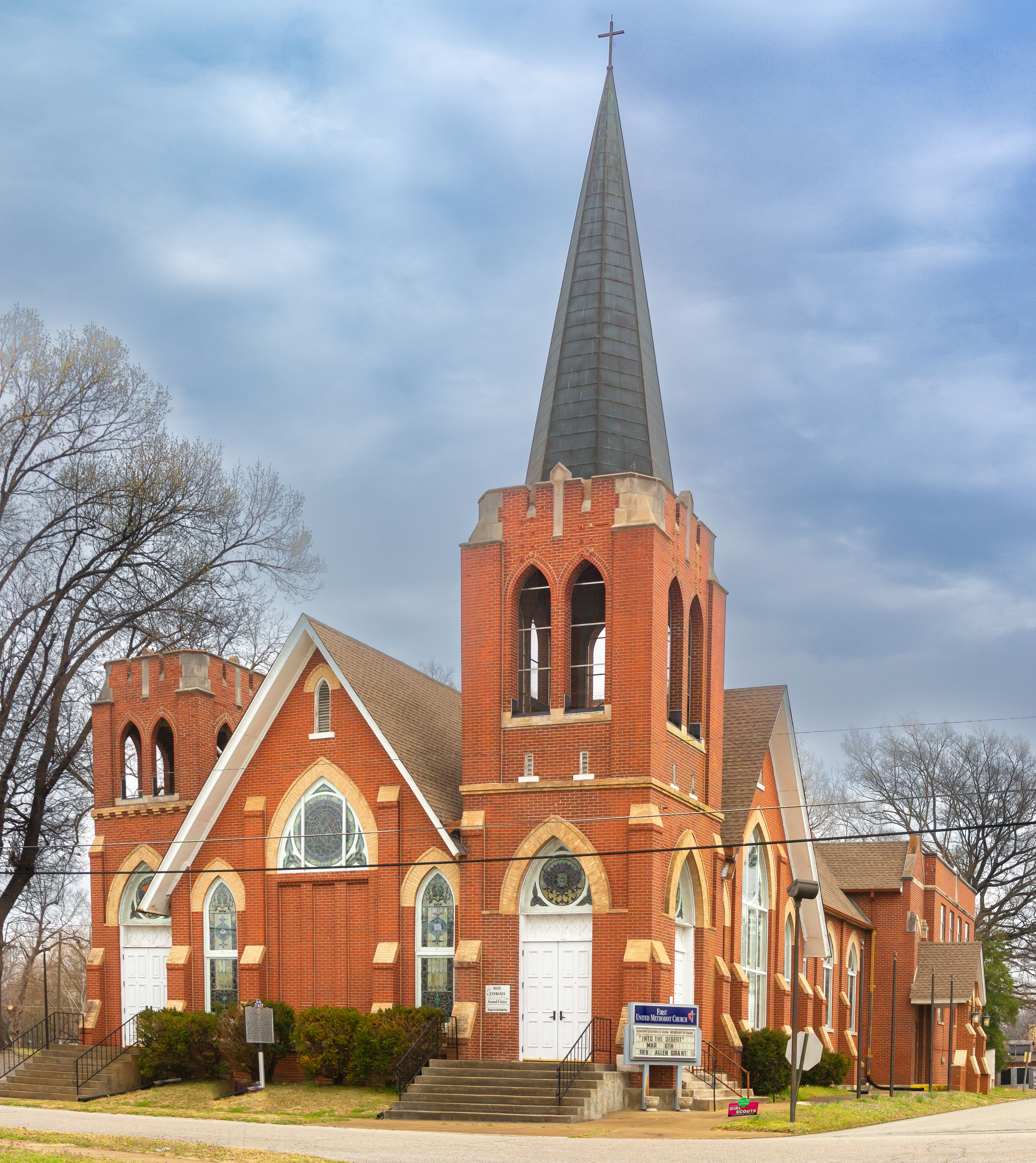

- Location within Tennessee Location within the United States
- Location: 200 N. 12th Ave., Humboldt, Tennessee
- Coordinates: 35.82096°N 88.91845°W
- Area: less than one acre
- Built: 1899
- Architectural style: Gothic Revival
- NRHP reference No.: 08000702
- Added to NRHP: July 23, 2008

The First United Methodist Church, formerly First Methodist Episcopal Church, South, is a historic Methodist church at 200 N. 12th Avenue in Humboldt, Tennessee.

The church was organized in 1860, the second church to be established in Humboldt. Its current building was completed in 1899, replacing a frame building that had been built on the same site in 1867. It was added to the National Register of Historic Places in 2008.
