= WOGO =

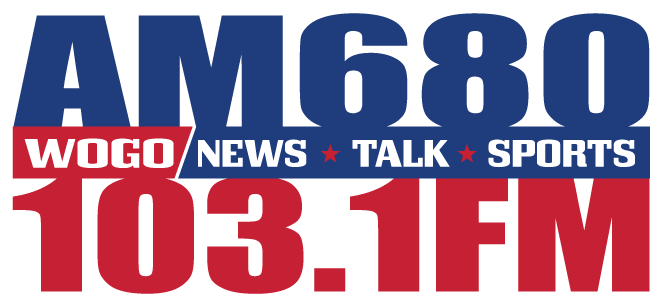
- Hallie, Wisconsin; United States
- Broadcast area: Eau Claire, Wisconsin
- Frequency: 680 kHz
- Branding: 680 WOGO

Programming
- Format: Conservative talk

Ownership
- Owner: Stewards of Sound, Inc.
- Sister stations: WWIB

History
- First air date: 1985

Technical information
- Licensing authority: FCC
- Facility ID: 63427
- Class: B
- Power: 2,500 watts day; 500 watts night
- Transmitter coordinates: 44°53′22.00″N 91°23′3.00″W
- Translator: 103.1 W276CP (Hallie)

Links
- Public license information: Public file; LMS
- Webcast: Listen Live
- Website: wogo.com

WOGO (680 AM) is a radio station broadcasting a conservative talk format. Licensed to Hallie, Wisconsin, United States, the station serves the Eau Claire area. The station is owned by Stewards of Sound, Inc. WOGO was originally licensed to Cornell, Wisconsin.
