= St. Patrick's Church (Eau Claire, Wisconsin) =

Historic church in Wisconsin, United States

- U.S. National Register of Historic Places
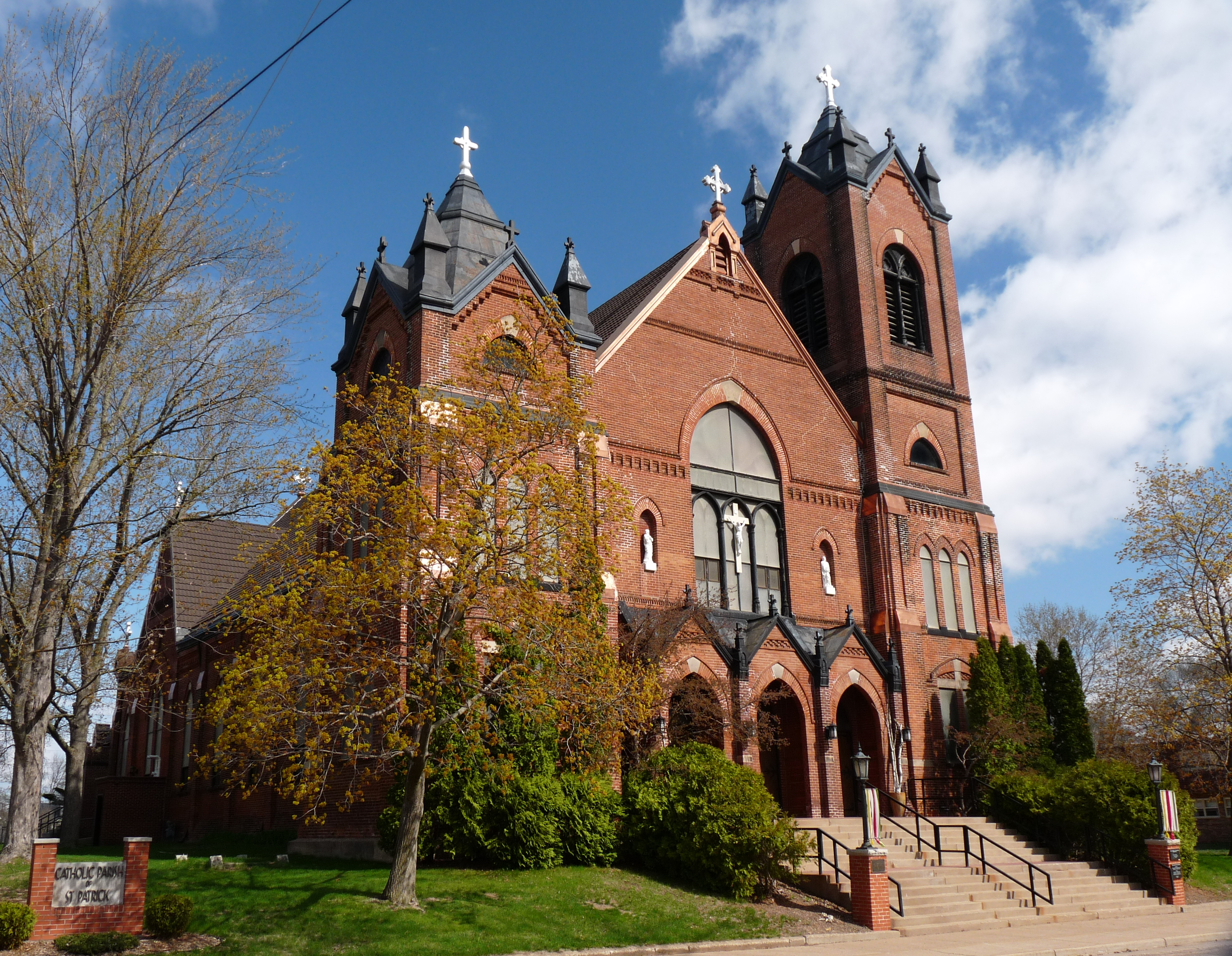
- Location: 322 Fulton St. Eau Claire, Wisconsin
- Coordinates: 44.81129°N 91.50853°W
- Built: 1885
- Architectural style: Gothic Revival/Romanesque Revival
- NRHP reference No.: 83003392
- Added to NRHP: January 28, 1983

St. Patrick's Church is a historic Catholic church built in 1885 in Eau Claire, Wisconsin. It was added to the National Register of Historic Places in 1983 for its architectural significance.

St. Patrick's parish was established in the 1850s by missionaries from Chippewa Falls, with a frame church built on N. Barstow Street in 1858. The parish added a school in 1870. In 1875 some of the German-speaking families split off to form Sacred Heart Church. In 1880 St. Patrick's bought the current lot at the corner of Fulton and Oxford, dedicating their new church building in 1882, but it burned in 1884, before they could finish the brick veneer. In the next year the current church was built on the same site.

The current (1885) church was designed by Abraham M. Radcliffe - a brick building with a gable roof and three matched doors across the front. Above the doors are a window and wall recesses holding statues. To each side of the front door stands a square tower - the right tower has four stages and the left three. The towers and the side walls are buttressed. On the exterior, Radcliffe mixes styles, with narrow lancet windows suggesting Gothic Revival style, yet some round arches suggest Romanesque Revival. An old postcard suggests that the right tower was once larger, topped with a steeple much taller than the current tower. Edward Henneberry and Cornelius Webster oversaw the stonework, and Henneberry the woodwork.

Built at the height of the log drives on the Chippewa River, St. Patrick's is the oldest surviving church building in Eau Claire.
