= Confluence Commercial Historic District =

Historic district in Wisconsin, United States

- U.S. National Register of Historic Places
- U.S. Historic district
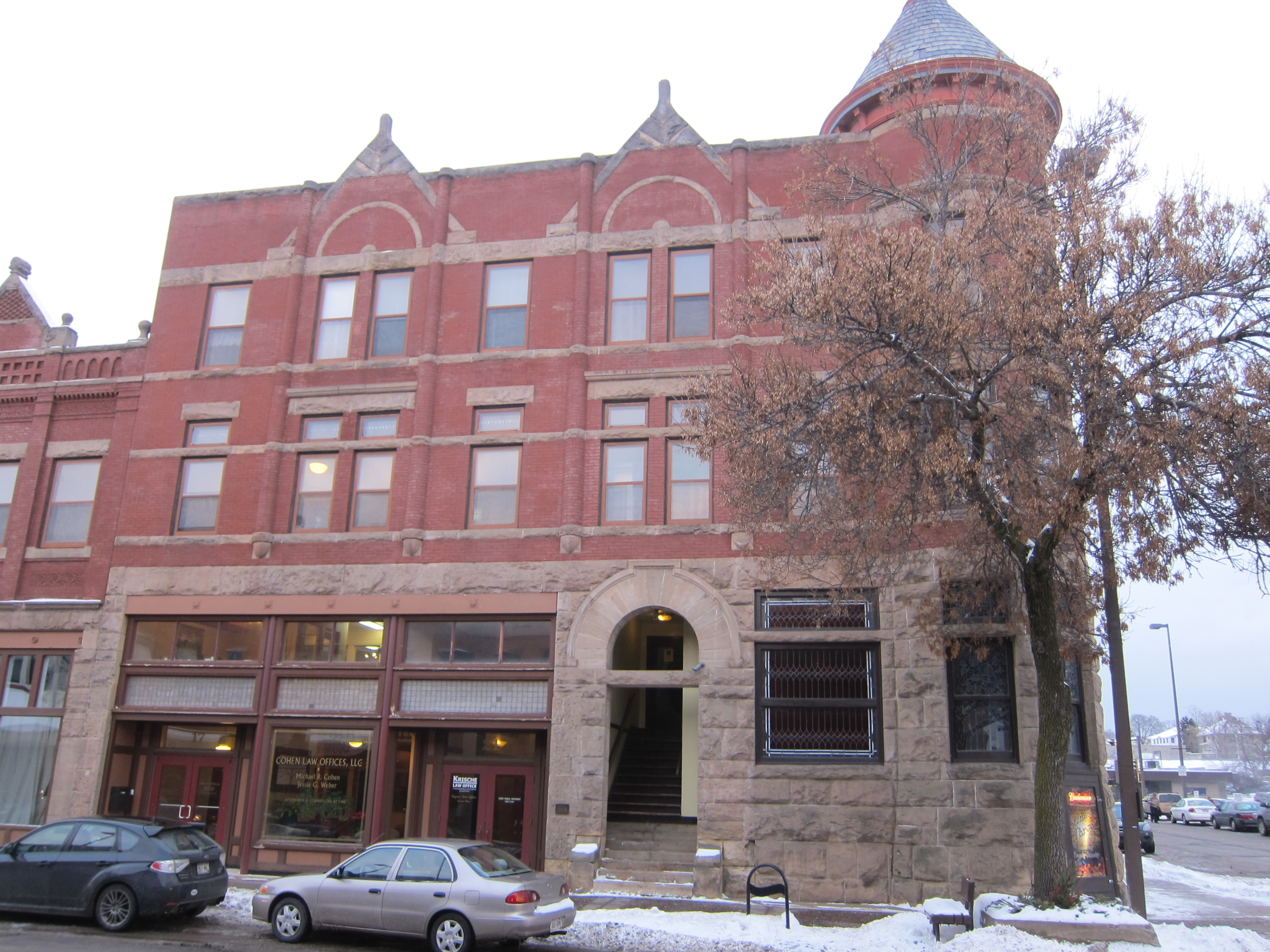
- Drummond-Cameron Block at the corner of Eau Claire and Barstow Streets

- Location within Wisconsin Location within the United States
- Location: Eau Claire, Wisconsin
- Coordinates: 44°48′44″N 91°30′2″W
- NRHP reference No.: 07001047
- Added to NRHP: October 3, 2007

The Confluence Commercial Historic District is located in Eau Claire, Wisconsin. It was added to the National Register of Historic Places in 2007.

== History ==
The area was first populated by French Canadian immigrants. Contributing buildings in the district were constructed from 1861 to 1936.
