= Lutheran Church of the Good Shepherd, Eau Claire, Wisconsin =

Church in Wisconsin, United States

- The Lutheran Church of the Good Shepherd
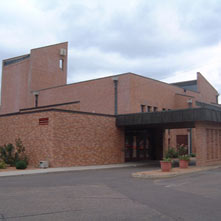
- Front side of church
- Lutheran Church of the Good Shepherd, Eau Claire, Wisconsin
- 44.8219°N 91.525°W
- Location: 1120 Cedar Street, Eau Claire, Wisconsin 54703
- Country: United States
- Denomination: Evangelical Lutheran Church in America
- Website: www.goodshepherd-ec.org

History
- Founded: May 15, 1955
- Founder: Dr. Edwin Hegge
- Dedicated: April 1970

Clergy
- Pastor: Michael Wollman

The Lutheran Church of the Good Shepherd (erected May 15, 1955) is an Evangelical Lutheran church on Cedar Street in Eau Claire, Wisconsin. The church, a member of the Evangelical Lutheran Church in America, has been in existence since 1955.

== History ==
The Lutheran Church of the Good Shepherd is one of two Lutheran mission churches in Eau Claire, Wisconsin that were developed during the 1950s. In 1953, land for the church was purchased on Cedar Street, on Eau Claire’s west side, and construction of the church began. The first service was held on May 15, 1955, in the original church sanctuary, which later was used for Sunday school education rooms. With 445 members, Good Shepherd was self-supporting by the fall of 1955. Dr. Edwin M. Hegge was installed as the senior pastor on November 27, 1955. In January 1959, a new educational wing was dedicated. In April 1970, the current church sanctuary was dedicated, and by the beginning of 1971 the church had grown to 1,719 members. In spring of 2005, the church built a new gathering area and elevator in commemoration of its 50th anniversary.

In September 1998, land was purchased in order to build a retirement home under the auspices of the Good Shepherd Lutheran Foundation. In October 2001, the Good Shepherd Senior Apartments were dedicated and a new ministry was born. In January 2005, the most recent remodeling and expansion project of the church was celebrated.

== Leadership ==
Good Shepherd is governed by an 11-member church council elected at-large by the congregation. There have been four senior pastors and six assistant pastors since 1955. Joshua Toufar was installed as the pastor of the church.

== Bibliography ==
- Celebrating 50 Years of Ministry. Winnipeg, MB: Lifetouch Church Directories and Portraits. 2005.
