= Eau Claire, Wisconsin =

City in Wisconsin, United States

- City
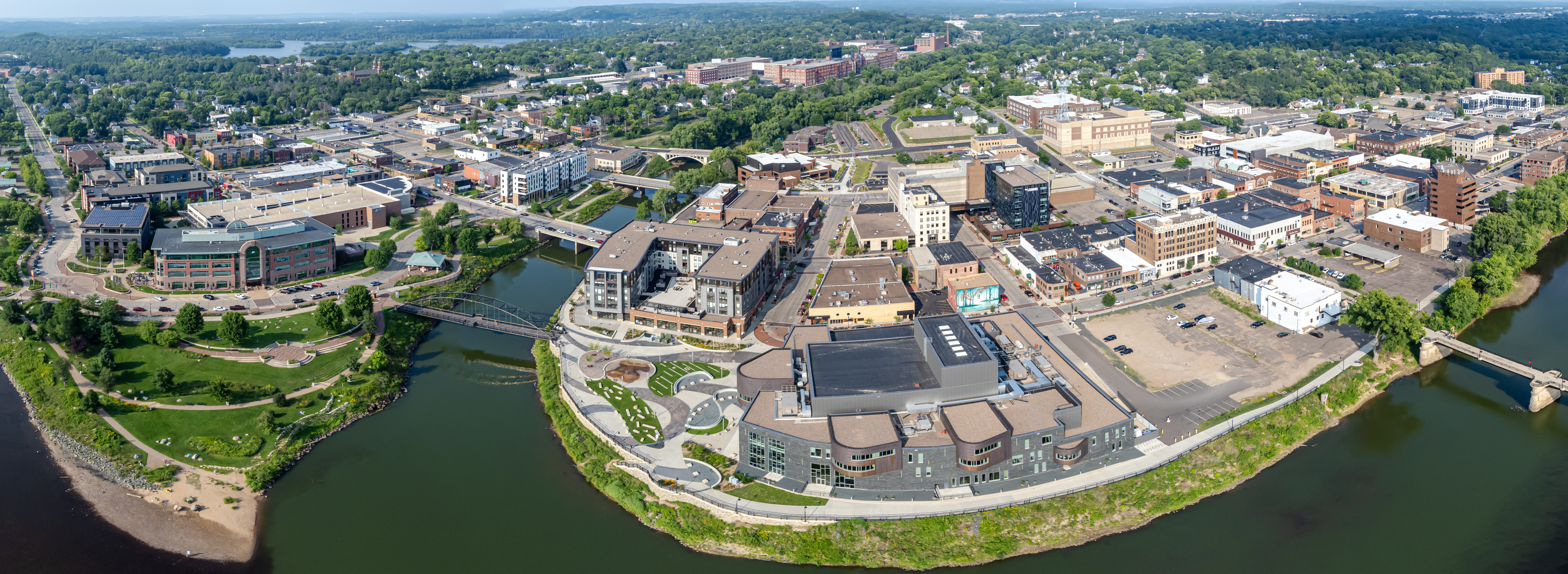
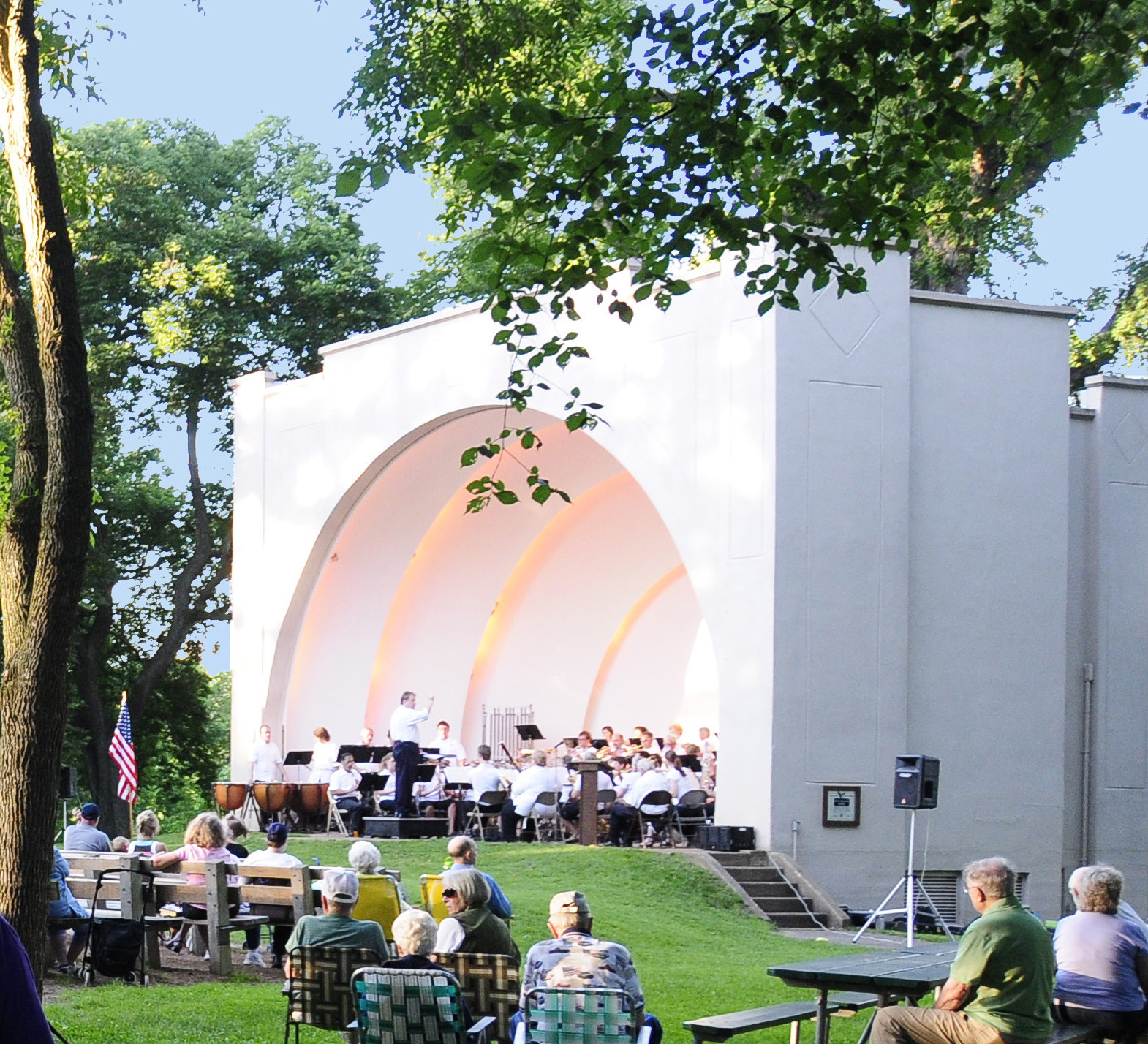
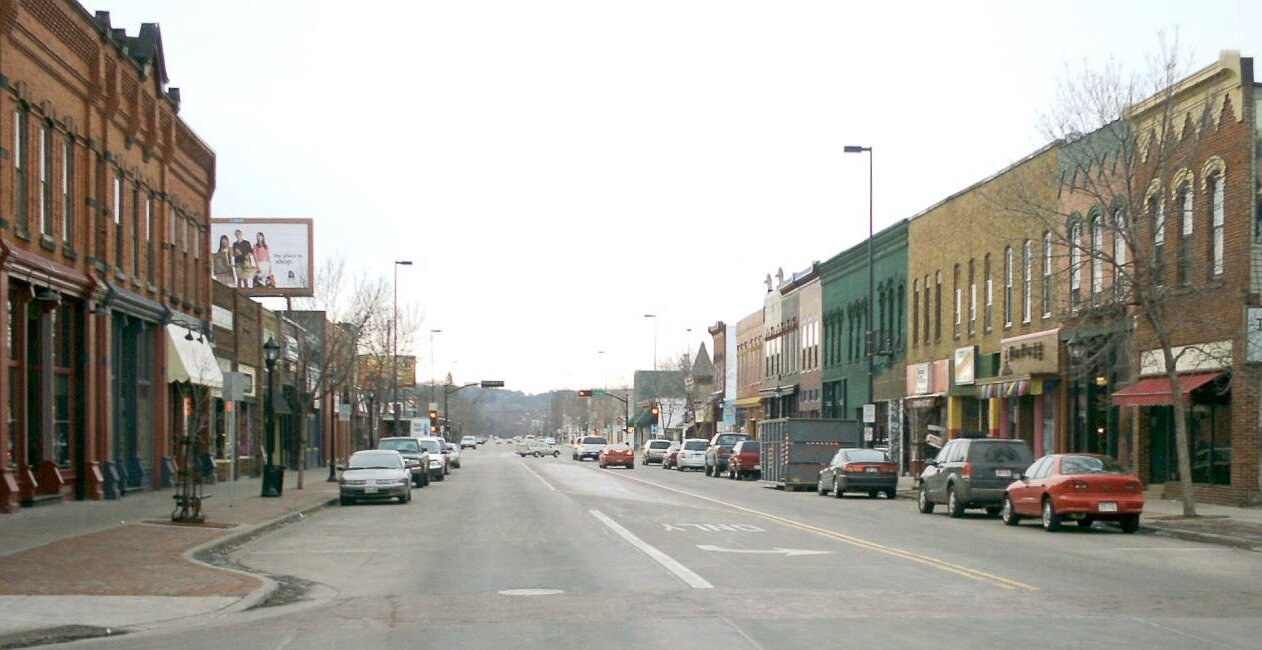
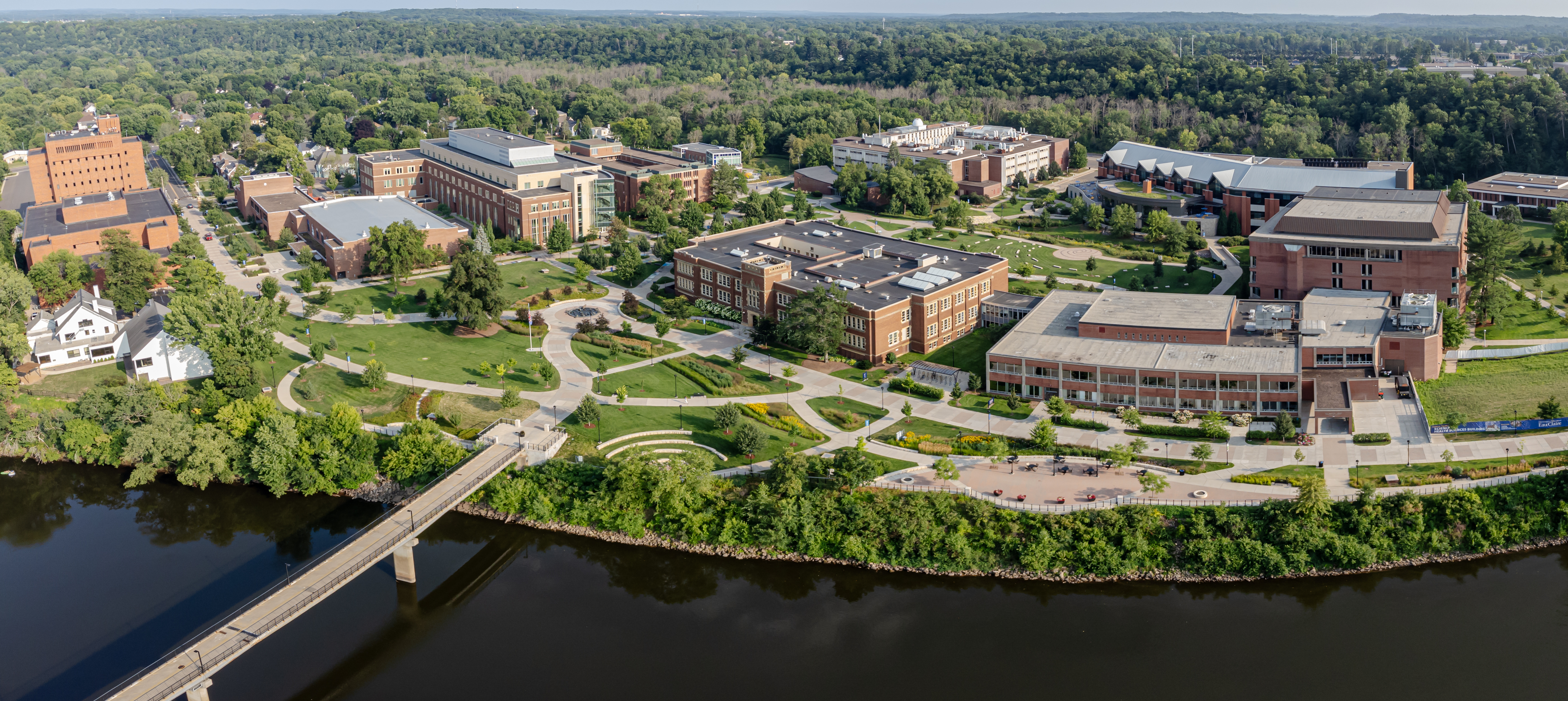
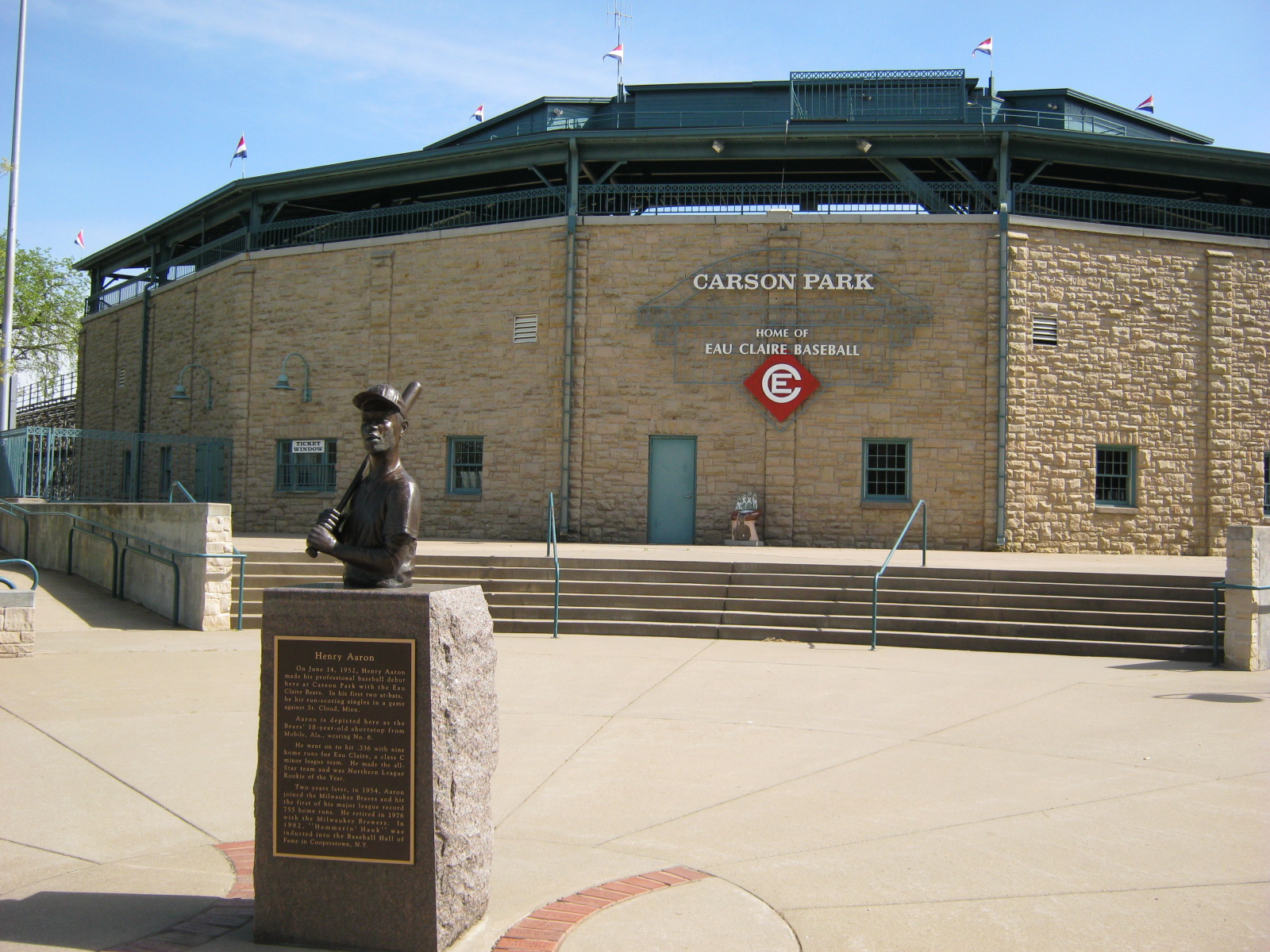
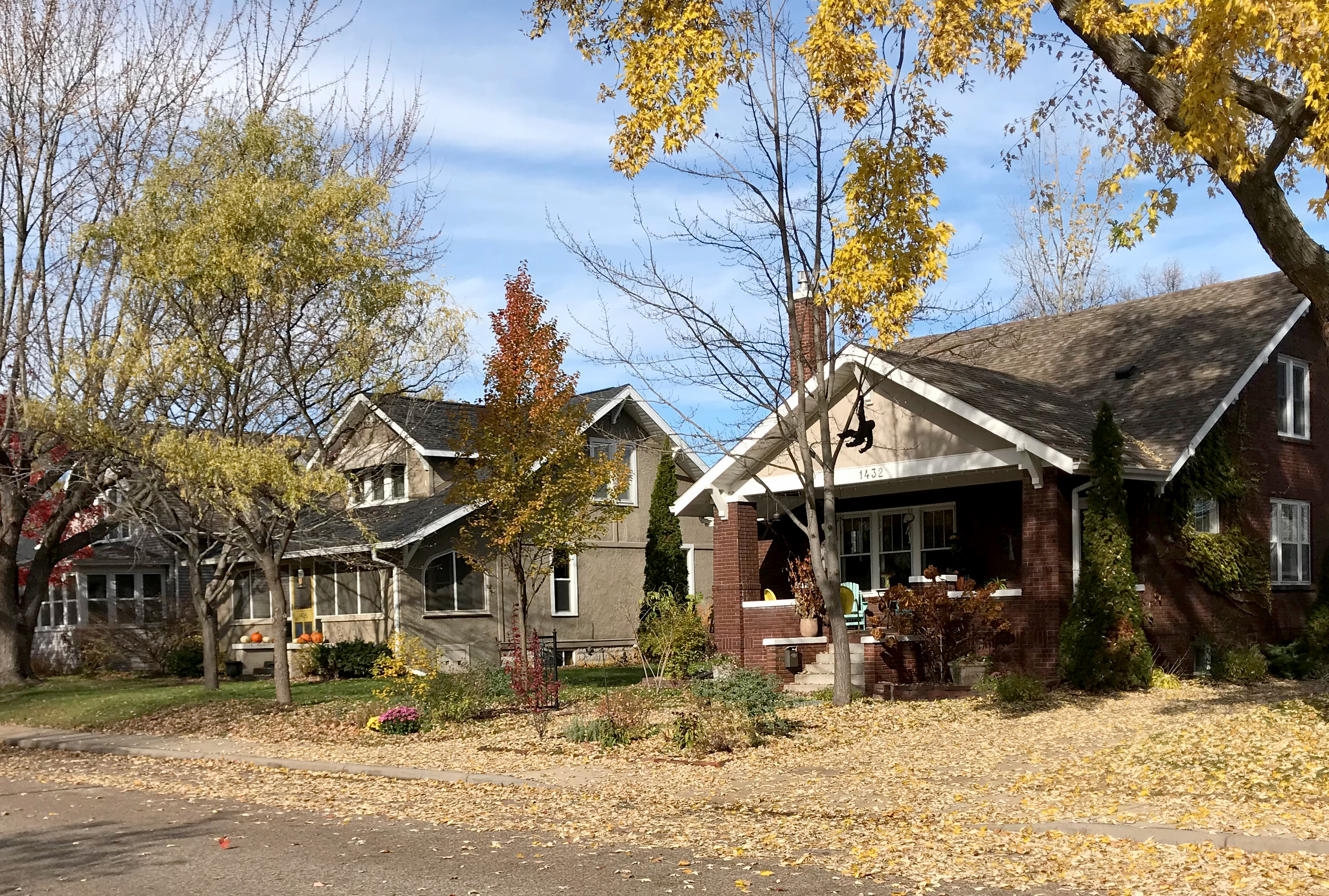
- Confluence Historic District and Eau Claire River Owen Park Bandshell Water Street Historic District University of Wisconsin-Eau Claire and Chippewa River Carson Park Emery Street Bungalow District
- Motto: Voici l'eau claire! (French: Here is the clear water!)
- Interactive map of Eau Claire, Wisconsin
- Location in Wisconsin Location in the United States
- Coordinates: 44°49′N 91°30′W
- Country: United States
- State: Wisconsin
- Counties: Eau Claire, Chippewa
- Established: 1856

Government
  - Type: Council–manager
  - City manager: Dave Solberg
  - State Assembly: Jodi Emerson (D); Christian Phelps (D)
  - State Senate: Jeff Smith (D)
  - U.S. House: Derrick Van Orden (R)

Area
  - City: 34.95 sq mi (90.53 km^{2})
  - Land: 32.86 sq mi (85.10 km^{2})
  - Water: 2.09 sq mi (5.42 km^{2}) 6.15%
- Elevation: 790 ft (240 m)

Population (2020)
  - City: 69,421
  - Estimate (2024): 72,331
  - Rank: WI: 8th
  - Density: 2,112.8/sq mi (815.8/km^{2})
  - Metro: 161,151
- Time zone: UTC−6 (CST)
  - Summer (DST): UTC−5 (CDT)
- Zip code: 54701-54703
- Area codes: 715 & 534
- FIPS code: 55-22300
- GNIS feature ID: 1583124
- Website: http://www.eauclairewi.gov

Eau Claire (/oʊˈklɛər/ oh-KLAIR; French: [o klɛʁ] lit. 'clear water') is a city in Eau Claire and Chippewa counties in the U.S. state of Wisconsin. It is the county seat of Eau Claire County. It is the seventh-most populous city in Wisconsin, with a population of 69,421 at the 2020 census. As of 2026 population signs show an increase to 74,309 residents. The Eau Claire metropolitan area, known locally as the Chippewa Valley, has approximately 176,000 residents.

Eau Claire is at the confluence of the Eau Claire and Chippewa rivers on traditional Ojibwe, Dakota, and Ho-Chunk land. The area's first permanent European American settlers arrived in 1845, and Eau Claire was incorporated as a city in 1872. The city's early growth came from its extensive logging and timber industries. After Eau Claire's lumber industry declined in the early 20th century, the city's economy diversified to encompass manufacturing and Eau Claire became an educational center with the opening of the University of Wisconsin–Eau Claire in 1916.

Eau Claire is known regionally for its arts and music scenes and is the home of the annual Eaux Claires Music & Arts Festival whose main founder, Justin Vernon (known best for his works in the musical group Bon Iver), is also a Eau Claire local. Eau Claire is also a regional commercial and business center and home to the headquarters of home improvement store chain Menards. Eau Claire is the second-fastest growing major city in Wisconsin after Madison, with 5.4% population growth between 2010 and 2020.

== Etymology ==
Eau Claire took its name from Eau Claire County. "Eau Claire" is the singular form of the original French name, "Eaux Claires", meaning "Clear Waters", for the Eau Claire River. According to local legend, the river was so named because early French explorers journeying down the rain-muddied Chippewa River, came upon the confluence with the Eau Claire River, and excitedly exclaimed the contrast: "Voici l'eau claire !" ("Here is the clear water!"). Now the city motto, this appears on the city seal.

== History ==
The Eau Claire area was first visited by Europeans in the late 17th century. It had been occupied for thousands of years before European fur traders began settling there for trade with local Native American tribes.

The First Treaty of Prairie du Chien, signed in 1825, established the Chippewa River "half a day's march below the falls" as the boundary between the Sioux and Chippewa, and the "Clear Water River, a branch of the Chippewa" as the boundary between the Chippewa and Winnebago.

The first permanent European-American settlers arrived in 1845, and the city was officially incorporated in 1872. Extensive timber was harvested and logging was the major industry during this time; many sawmills were built as part of the lumber industry. Sawmills and other manufacturing made Eau Claire an industrial city by the late 19th century.

The city was founded near the confluence of the Eau Claire and Chippewa rivers as three separate settlements. The main section of downtown is on the site of the original European-American village, where Stephen McCann, in partnership with J. C. Thomas, put up three buildings in 1845. Although these structures were erected primarily to establish a claim to the land site, the McCann family moved into one of them and became the first permanent settlers.

West Eau Claire, founded in 1856, was across the river, near the site of the current county courthouse, and was incorporated in 1872. Between a mile and a half and two miles downstream, the Daniel Shaw & Co. lumber company founded Shawtown, beyond the west end of what is now the Water Street historic district. Shawtown was annexed to the city of Eau Claire by the 1930s. By the 1950s, the entire city had spread far enough to the east to adjoin Altoona.

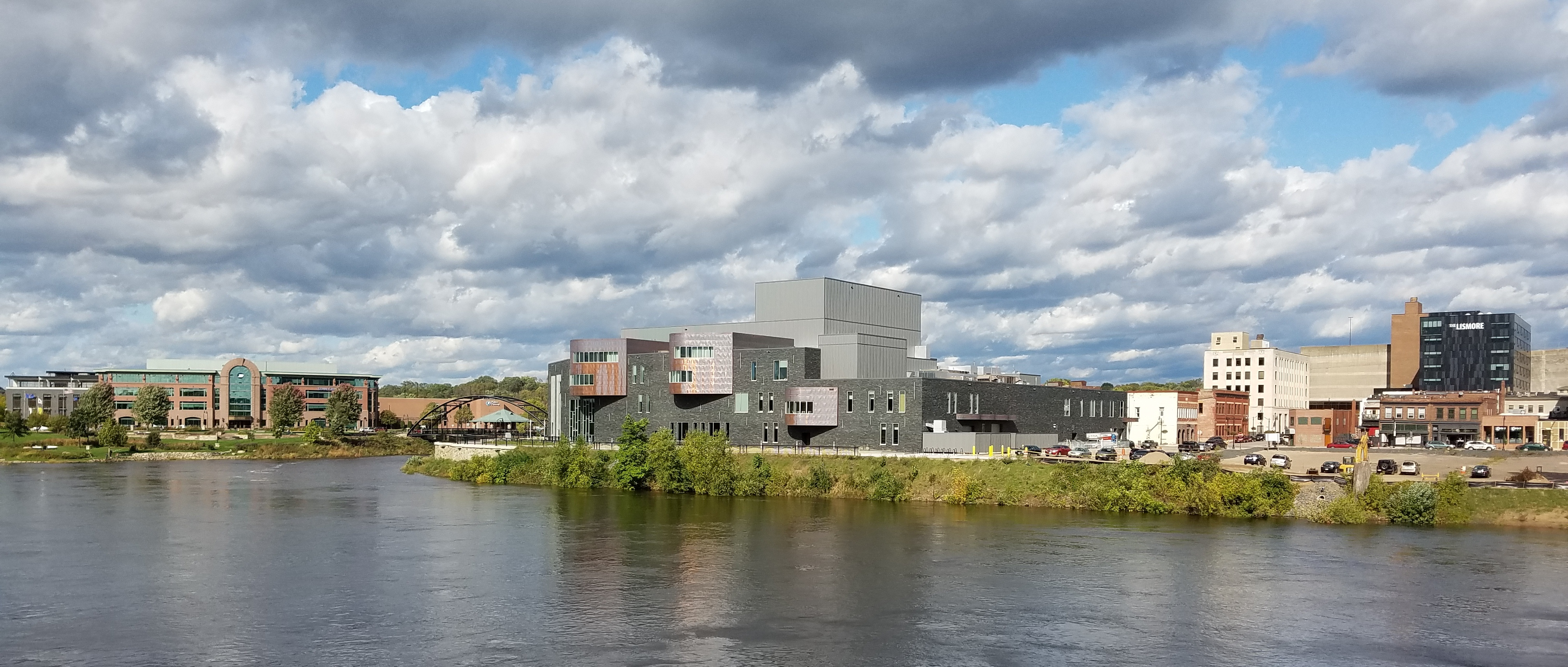
Downtown Eau Claire

In 1916, the University of Wisconsin–Eau Claire was founded, which marked the turn from a mostly lumber production based economy into one centered around manufacturing, education, and healthcare.

In 1917, Gillette Safety Tire Company built a large factory in Eau Claire along the Eau Claire River less than a mile from where the rivers meet. The factory mainly created rubber tires and tubing. It had about 1,600 workers in 1920, producing almost 500 tires and 500 rubber tubing everyday. These numbers have increased every year since it opened in 1917. In 1931, United States Rubber Company agreed to purchase Gillette, a sale not completed until 1940 owing to the Great Depression. Due to the start of World War II, the US War Department brought the facility in 1942 to use as an ammunition plant. At the height of the war effort, the plant had over 6,000 employees. Toward the end of the war, the government sold the building back to its original owners, and it was quickly converted back to manufacturing tire products. Throughout the decades after the war, the plant received multiple expansions and was renamed Uniroyal in 1967.

In 1991, Uniroyal, one of the largest factories in Eau Claire at the time, announced it would shutter the facility, ultimately causing 1,358 workers to lose their jobs. Although this factory shutdown was detrimental to Eau Claire's economy, the unemployment rate fell from 1991 to 1992. Today the complex, now named Banbury Place, is used as a small business incubator and leased to existing businesses and organizations.

In 1982, the Eau Claire Landmarks Commission and the State Historical Society of Wisconsin conducted a survey of historically and architecturally significant properties, identifying the Randall Park, Third Ward, and Emery Street Bungalow historic districts, most of which were listed on the National Register of Historic Places in 1983.

== Geography ==
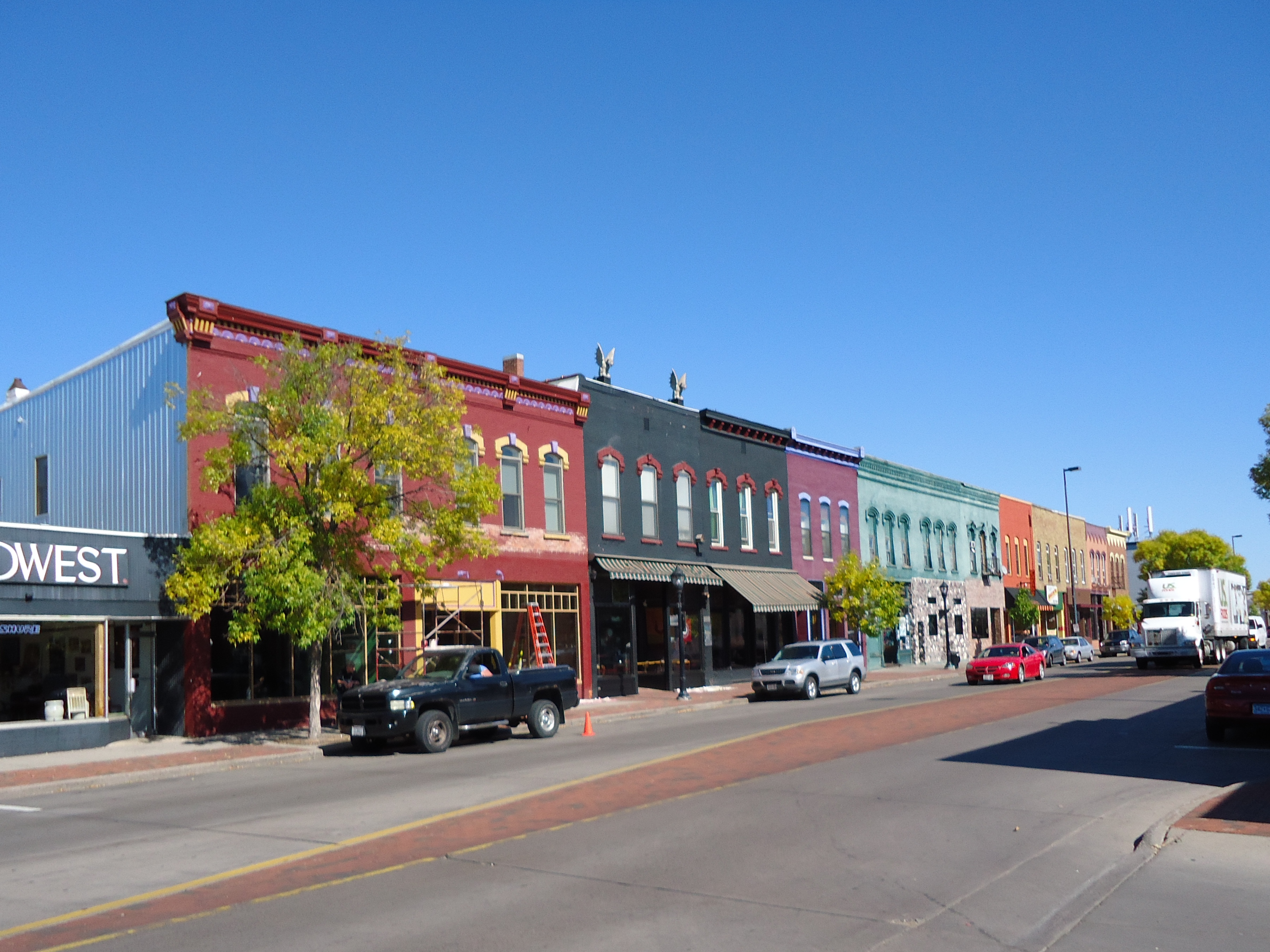
Water Street historic district

Eau Claire is about 90 miles (145 kilometers) east of Minneapolis and St. Paul, Minnesota, on the northern fringes of the Driftless Zone.

According to the United States Census Bureau, the city has an area of 34.14 square miles (88.42 km^{2}), of which 32.04 square miles (82.98 km^{2}) is land and 2.10 square miles (5.44 km^{2}) is water.

The city's terrain is characterized by the river valleys, with steep slopes leading from the center to the eastern and southern sections of the city. The lands into which the urban area is expanding are increasingly hilly.

There are two lakes in the city, Dells Pond and Half Moon Lake. Dells Pond is a reservoir created by a hydroelectric dam, and was formerly used as a holding pool for logs. Half Moon Lake is an oxbow lake created as part of the former course of the Chippewa River.

=== Climate ===
In the Köppen climate classification, Eau Claire is classified as a humid continental climate (Dfb bordering on Dfa), usually termed as the subtype of warm, sometimes hot, summer. Its climate is due to its latitude and interior location in North America. The average annual temperature is only 46 °F (8 °C). The extremes exceed 110 °F (43 °C) and −40 °F, which demonstrate the four well-defined seasons of the year. The amount of annual snowfall (47") exceeds the amount of annual rainfall (31"), the total precipitation is greater than other major cities in Wisconsin such as Milwaukee and Madison. July has an average temperature of 71.6 °F (22.0 °C) and January an average of 14.4 °F (−9.8 °C), where temperatures below freezing point can remain for a long duration.

Climate data for Eau Claire Regional Airport, Wisconsin (1991–2020 normals, extremes 1893–present)
Month	Jan	Feb	Mar	Apr	May	Jun	Jul	Aug	Sep	Oct	Nov	Dec	Year
Record high °F (°C)	55 (13)	63 (17)	84 (29)	91 (33)	107 (42)	105 (41)	111 (44)	104 (40)	101 (38)	89 (32)	79 (26)	64 (18)	111 (44)
Mean maximum °F (°C)	42 (6)	47 (8)	64 (18)	80 (27)	88 (31)	92 (33)	93 (34)	91 (33)	87 (31)	79 (26)	62 (17)	47 (8)	95 (35)
Mean daily maximum °F (°C)	23.4 (−4.8)	28.4 (−2.0)	41.3 (5.2)	56.5 (13.6)	69.6 (20.9)	78.7 (25.9)	82.8 (28.2)	80.4 (26.9)	72.3 (22.4)	58.0 (14.4)	42.0 (5.6)	28.7 (−1.8)	55.2 (12.9)
Daily mean °F (°C)	14.6 (−9.7)	18.8 (−7.3)	31.2 (−0.4)	44.8 (7.1)	57.4 (14.1)	67.1 (19.5)	71.3 (21.8)	69.1 (20.6)	60.8 (16.0)	47.5 (8.6)	33.4 (0.8)	20.6 (−6.3)	44.7 (7.1)
Mean daily minimum °F (°C)	5.8 (−14.6)	9.1 (−12.7)	21.2 (−6.0)	33.2 (0.7)	45.1 (7.3)	55.5 (13.1)	59.8 (15.4)	57.7 (14.3)	49.3 (9.6)	36.9 (2.7)	24.7 (−4.1)	12.6 (−10.8)	34.2 (1.2)
Mean minimum °F (°C)	−17 (−27)	−13 (−25)	−1 (−18)	18 (−8)	30 (−1)	42 (6)	49 (9)	46 (8)	34 (1)	22 (−6)	7 (−14)	−11 (−24)	−20 (−29)
Record low °F (°C)	−45 (−43)	−40 (−40)	−35 (−37)	0 (−18)	20 (−7)	25 (−4)	41 (5)	36 (2)	22 (−6)	7 (−14)	−18 (−28)	−32 (−36)	−45 (−43)
Average precipitation inches (mm)	1.03 (26)	1.10 (28)	1.97 (50)	3.08 (78)	3.91 (99)	4.83 (123)	3.61 (92)	4.18 (106)	3.65 (93)	2.49 (63)	1.79 (45)	1.35 (34)	32.99 (838)
Average snowfall inches (cm)	13.5 (34)	11.2 (28)	9.6 (24)	4.3 (11)	0.4 (1.0)	0.0 (0.0)	0.0 (0.0)	0.0 (0.0)	0.0 (0.0)	0.7 (1.8)	4.7 (12)	11.0 (28)	55.4 (141)
Average extreme snow depth inches (cm)	10.1 (26)	11.7 (30)	9.4 (24)	2.2 (5.6)	0.3 (0.76)	0.0 (0.0)	0.0 (0.0)	0.0 (0.0)	0.0 (0.0)	0.4 (1.0)	2.5 (6.4)	7.5 (19)	14.4 (37)
Average precipitation days (≥ 0.01 in)	10.7	8.2	9.6	11.8	13.3	12.3	11.3	10.4	10.9	10.1	8.9	10.1	127.6
Average snowy days (≥ 0.1 in)	10.9	8.3	5.8	2.9	0.1	0.0	0.0	0.0	0.0	0.7	4.7	9.0	42.4
Source: NOAA

== Demographics ==
Graham Avenue

Historical population
Census	Pop.	Note	%±
1870	2,293		—
1880	10,119		341.3%
1890	17,415		72.1%
1900	17,517		0.6%
1910	18,310		4.5%
1920	20,906		14.2%
1930	26,287		25.7%
1940	30,745		17.0%
1950	36,058		17.3%
1960	37,987		5.3%
1970	44,619		17.5%
1980	51,509		15.4%
1990	56,856		10.4%
2000	61,704		8.5%
2010	65,883		6.8%
2020	69,421		5.4%
2024 (est.)	72,331		4.2%
U.S. Decennial Census

=== 2020 census ===
As of the 2020 census, Eau Claire had a population of 69,421 and a population density of 2,112.8 inhabitants per square mile (815.8/km^{2}). There were 29,987 housing units at an average density of 912.6 units per square mile (352.4 units/km^{2}), 3.7% of which were vacant; the homeowner vacancy rate was 0.8% and the rental vacancy rate was 3.3%.

The median age was 32.8 years. 19.3% of residents were under the age of 18 and 15.5% of residents were 65 years of age or older. For every 100 females there were 94.3 males, and for every 100 females age 18 and over there were 91.8 males age 18 and over.

99.9% of residents lived in urban areas, while 0.1% lived in rural areas.

There were 28,864 households in Eau Claire, of which 24.2% had children under the age of 18 living in them. Of all households, 38.1% were married-couple households, 22.6% were households with a male householder and no spouse or partner present, and 30.0% were households with a female householder and no spouse or partner present. About 34.3% of all households were made up of individuals and 12.1% had someone living alone who was 65 years of age or older.

The 2020 census population of the city included 147 people incarcerated in adult correctional facilities and 3,556 people in student housing.

Of the 69,421 people living in the city, 67,238 were living in Eau Claire County, and 2,183 were living in Chippewa County.

Racial composition as of the 2020 census
Race	Number	Percent
White	59,602	85.9%
Black or African American	1,071	1.5%
American Indian and Alaska Native	409	0.6%
Asian	3,938	5.7%
Native Hawaiian and Other Pacific Islander	74	0.1%
Some other race	786	1.1%
Two or more races	3,541	5.1%
Hispanic or Latino (of any race)	2,315	3.3%

=== 2016–2020 American Community Survey ===
According to the American Community Survey estimates for 2016–2020, the median income for a household in the city was $59,705, and the median income for a family was $82,851. Male full-time workers had a median income of $48,978 versus $39,147 for female workers. The per capita income for the city was $31,510. About 4.9% of families and 15.5% of the population were below the poverty line, including 11.4% of those under age 18 and 6.7% of those age 65 or over. Of the population age 25 and over, 95.5% were high school graduates or higher and 33.9% had a bachelor's degree or higher.

=== 2010 census ===
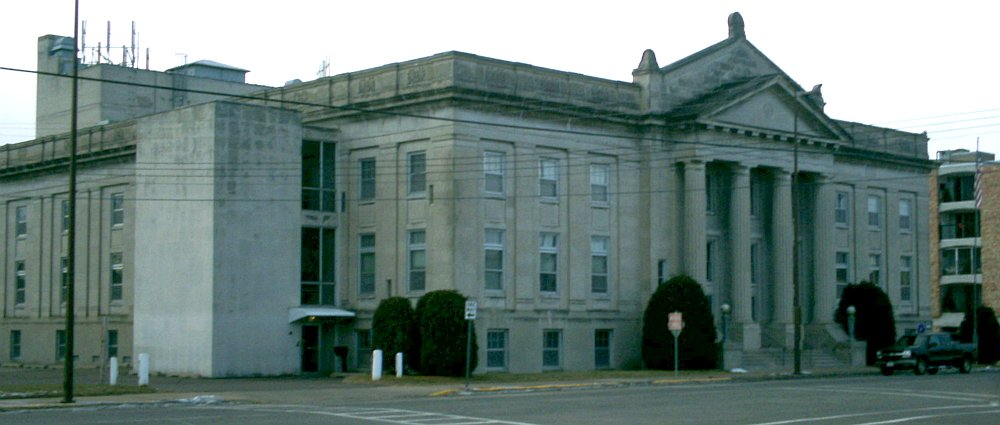
The Eau Claire Masonic Center is on the National Register of Historic Places.

As of the census of 2010, there were 65,883 people, 26,803 households, and 14,293 families residing in the city. The population density was 2,056.3 inhabitants per square mile (793.9/km^{2}). There were 28,134 housing units at an average density of 878.1 units per square mile (339.0 units/km^{2}). The racial makeup of the city was 91.4% White, 4.6% Asian, 1.1% African American, 0.5% Native American, 0.5% from other races, and 1.8% from two or more races. Hispanic or Latino people of any race were 1.9% of the population.

There were 26,803 households, of which 25.6% had children under the age of 18 living with them, 39.6% were married couples living together, 9.5% had a female householder with no husband present, 4.2% had a male householder with no wife present, and 46.7% were non-families. 31.7% of all households were made up of individuals, and 10.3% had someone living alone who was 65 years of age or older. The average household size was 2.29 and the average family size was 2.89.

The median age in the city was 29.8 years. 19.3% of residents were under the age of 18; 22.3% were between the ages of 18 and 24; 25.2% were from 25 to 44; 21.7% were from 45 to 64; and 11.7% were 65 years of age or older. The gender makeup of the city was 48.5% male and 51.5% female.

As of 2010, there were 1,981 persons within the city limits in Chippewa County and 63,902 in Eau Claire County for a total of 65,883.

=== Metropolitan area ===
The city forms the core of the United States Census Bureau's Eau Claire Metropolitan Statistical Area, which includes all of Eau Claire and Chippewa Counties (composite 2010 population: 161,151). Together with the Menomonie Micropolitan Statistical Area (which includes all of Dunn County) to the west, the Eau Claire metropolitan area, forms the Census Bureau's Eau Claire-Menomonie Consolidated Metropolitan Statistical Area, which had a consolidated 2010 population of 205,008.

=== Religion ===
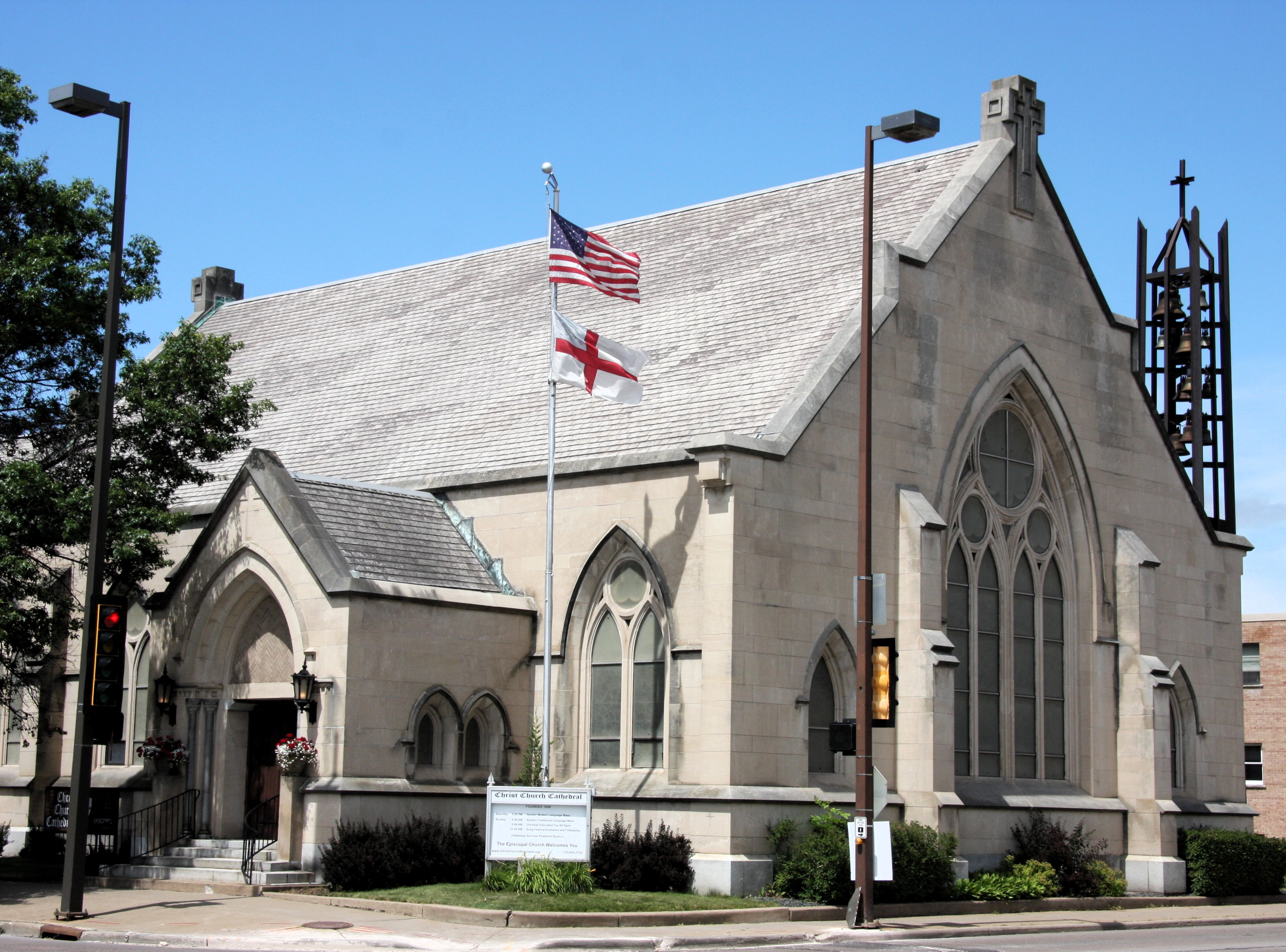
Christ Church Cathedral in Eau Claire

The Episcopal Diocese of Eau Claire was based in the city from 1928 until it reintegrated into the Diocese of Wisconsin in 2024. Christ Church Cathedral is one of three mother churches of the Diocese of Wisconsin. The city is also within the Roman Catholic Diocese of La Crosse and is home to Sacred Heart Church and St. Patrick's Church. Additionally, Community House, First Congregational Church, First Methodist Episcopal Church and the Lutheran Church of the Good Shepherd are in Eau Claire.

=== Ethnic communities ===
As of 2017, Hmong Americans were Eau Claire's largest ethnic minority and have been described as the city's "most visible ethnic group". Per the 2022 American Community Survey five-year estimates, the Hmong population was 2,868, comprising over 90% of the Asian population. While the Hmong population is smaller in Eau Claire County than in Milwaukee, the Hmong are a higher percentage of the population in Eau Claire County and are more prominent in the smaller Eau Claire metropolitan area. In some Eau Claire neighborhoods, up to 30% of the residents are Hmong.

Per the 2022 American Community Survey five-year estimates, the German American population was 25,676, comprising roughly 30% of the population.

Per the 2022 American Community Survey five-year estimates, the Norwegian American population was 11,672, comprising roughly 16% of the population.

== Economy ==
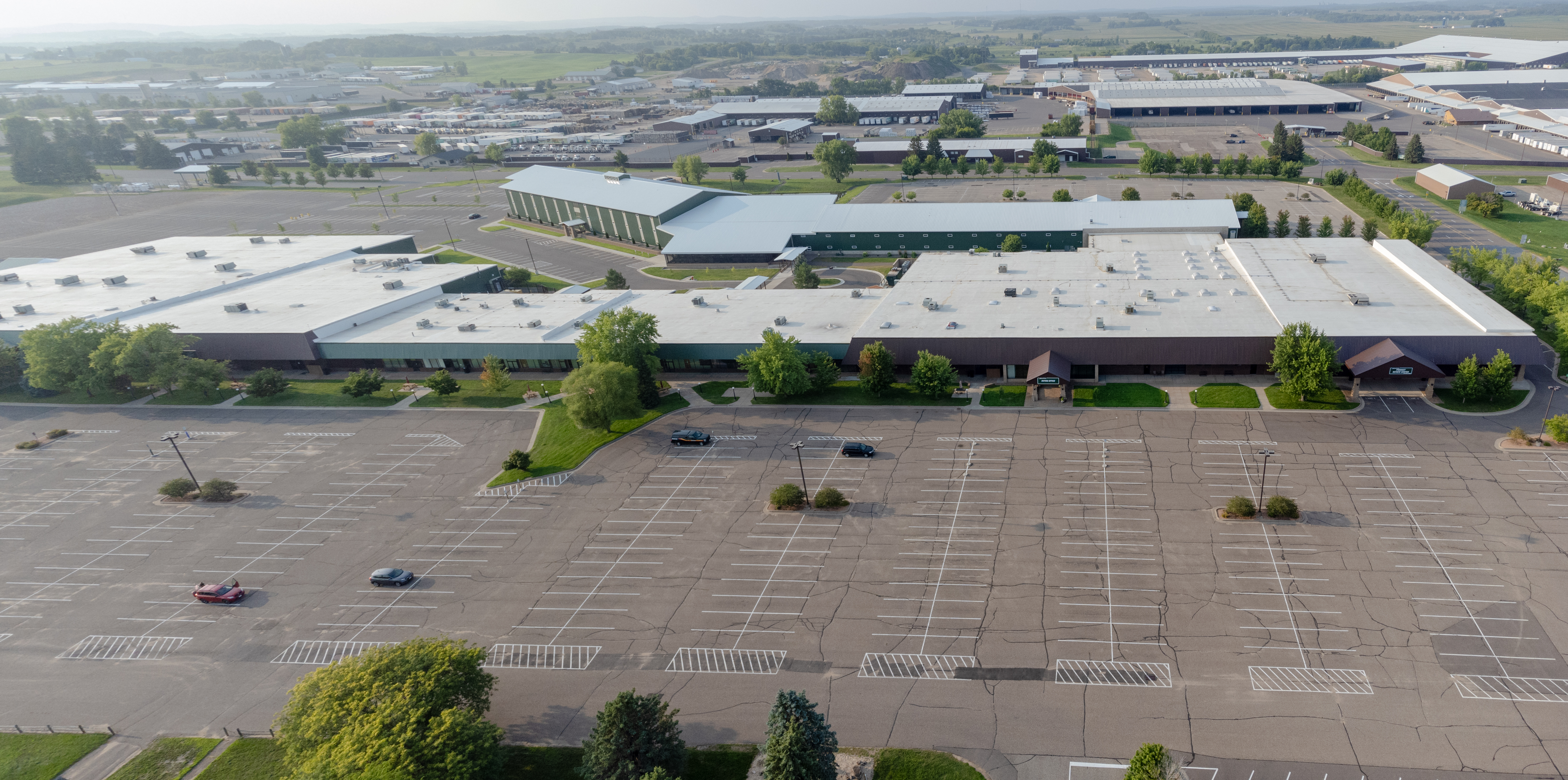
Menards headquarters

Eau Claire styles itself as the "horseradish capital of the world", due to the presence of Silver Spring Foods, the world's largest grower and producer of horseradish. The climate, with its cold winters, is conducive to the horseradish crop. Other significant crops grown in the area are apples, pumpkins and plums.

Menards, a Midwestern chain of home improvement stores owned by Wisconsin native John Menard Jr., is headquartered in Eau Claire. The city is home to Menards General Offices, 2 stores, and the flagship distribution center.

Other companies based in Eau Claire include National Presto Industries and Erbert & Gerbert's.

Oakwood Mall is Eau Claire's main mall. It has been open since 1986 and has 91 stores and services. Downtown Eau Claire and Water Street also include a variety of specialty shops, including bike shops, arcades, record shops, and antique stores.

== Arts and culture ==
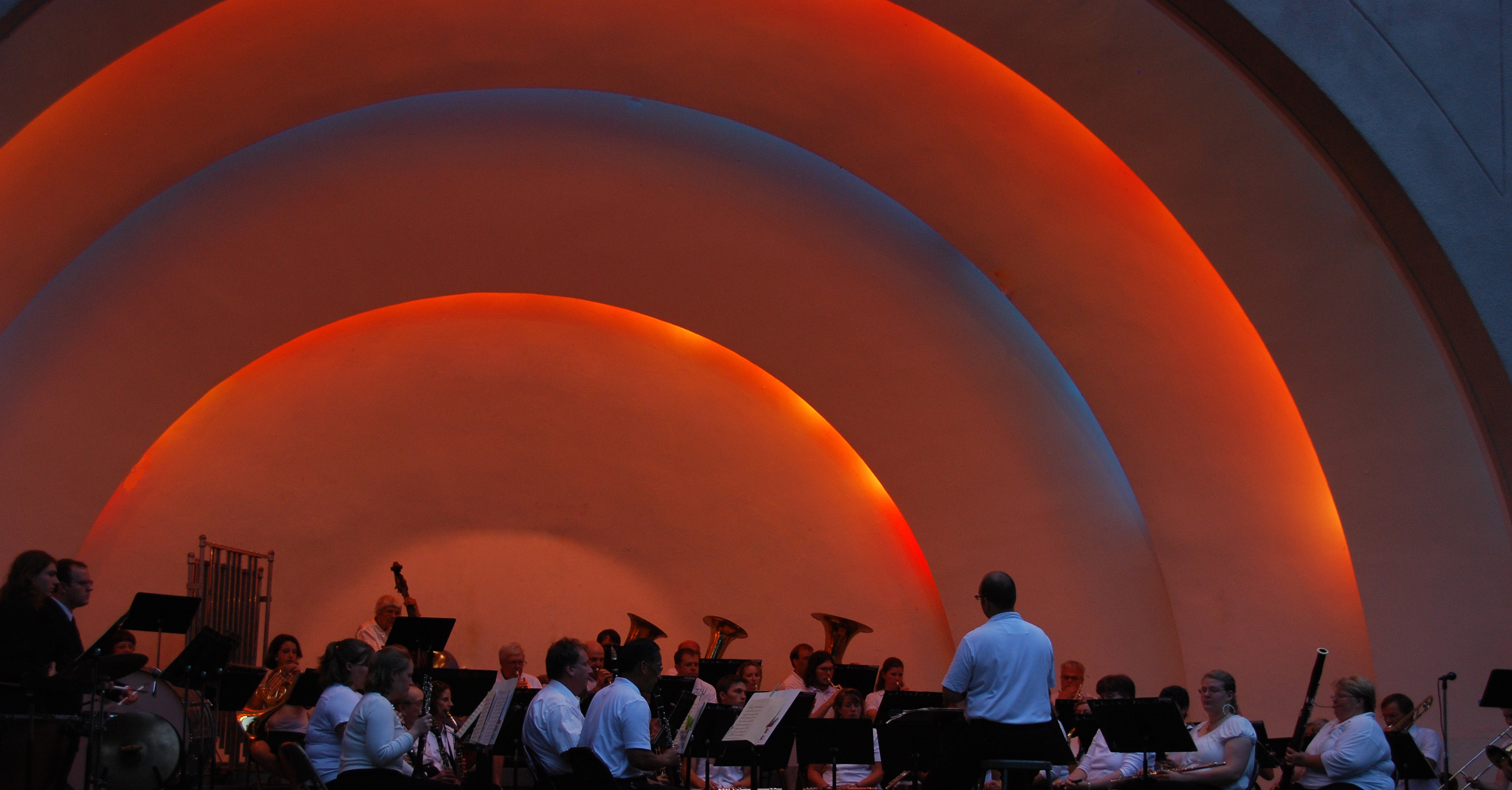
The Sarge Boyd Bandshell in Owen Park is listed on the National Register of Historic Places. It was built in 1938 to house the Eau Claire Municipal Band.

=== Performing arts ===
Eau Claire has a modest but active theater community. No professional theater groups make their home in the region, but amateur and community theaters have a significant presence; the most visible of these are the Chippewa Valley Theatre Guild (CVTG) and the Eau Claire Children's Theatre (ECCT). In addition, the University of Wisconsin-Eau Claire has a robust theatre program, and traveling professional shows frequently make stops in the city. The Pablo Center at the Confluence and Haas Fine Arts Center are the primary indoor performing arts venues, although both CVTG and ECCT have established their own independent venues, in 2006 and 2010 respectively.

The Pablo Center at the Confluence was opened in downtown Eau Claire on September 22, 2018. It was built to replace UW-Eau Claire's Kjer Theater as the primary venue for performing arts. Facilities include a 1,200-seat theatre, three rehearsal rooms, visual arts galleries, labs for sound and lighting, set and exhibit design, recording arts, multimedia production, and costume design.

=== Music ===
Justin Vernon, songwriter and frontman of indie folk band Bon Iver, was born and lives in the city. Eaux Claires was a two-day music festival that took place in the city in the 2010s, founded by Vernon and Aaron Dessner.

The Blugold Marching Band is a notable part of the University of Wisconsin-Eau Claire's music program, as well as a fixture of the Eau Claire community. The 475-member ensemble is the largest marching band in the Midwest. The band has gone on multiple tours across the Midwest, and had many performances on the world stage.

=== Film ===
The city has a small but active independent film community and is host to several annual film festivals including Midwest Weirdfest. The 19th century historical drama The Lumber Baron (2019), written and directed by Wisconsin State Representative Karen Hurd was filmed there in 2019, focused on the city's logging history. In 2025, the city endorsed Wisconsin’s state film tax incentives as part of broader efforts to support film and media production.

=== Sculpture tour ===
The Sculpture Tour Eau Claire is an ongoing outdoor sculpture exhibit along the streets of downtown Eau Claire. There are 53 sculptures, making this tour the second-largest of its type in the nation.

=== Farmers market ===
The Eau Claire Downtown Farmers Market is in Phoenix Park. It is open from May to October and offers a variety of produce and products.

== Sports ==
=== Baseball ===
Eau Claire has four amateur baseball teams. The Eau Claire Express play in the Northwoods League, an NCAA-sanctioned summer baseball league. Its home games are at Carson Park. The Eau Claire Cavaliers also play home games at Carson Park. In addition to the Cavaliers, the Eau Claire Bears and the Eau Claire Rivermen play in the Chippewa River Baseball League.

Three of Eau Claire's high schools have baseball teams. Eau Claire North H.S. won the 2011 and 2019 state championship.

Eau Claire also has a large youth baseball program, including a summer parks and recreation league, Little League (Nationals, American, Lowes Creek and Seymour). Eau Claire Little League teams have twice won the state championship (1998 Eau Claire Americans and 2012 Eau Claire Nationals) and advanced to Regional play in Indianapolis. A Babe Ruth League (13- to 18-year-olds) won state tournaments at ages 13, 14 and 15 in 2012. Those teams all went on to win 3rd place at their regional tournaments.

=== Football ===
The Eau Claire Axemen are an indoor American football team in The Arena League and began play in 2025 as an expansion team. The Axemen play their home games at the Sonnentag Event Center.

The Chippewa Valley Predators football team competes in the Northern Elite Football League and plays its home games at Carson Park. The team was established in 2001. The Northern Lights Cowboys compete in the Champions Amateur Football League and play their home games at Carson Park.

As of 2023, the Eau Claire Cowboys football team competes in the Northern Lights Football League and plays its home games at Carson Park It is also home to the two high school football teams along with the university.

=== Horseshoes ===
Eau Claire hosted the 2003 World Horseshoe Championship and the 2019 Wisconsin State Horseshoe Tournament.

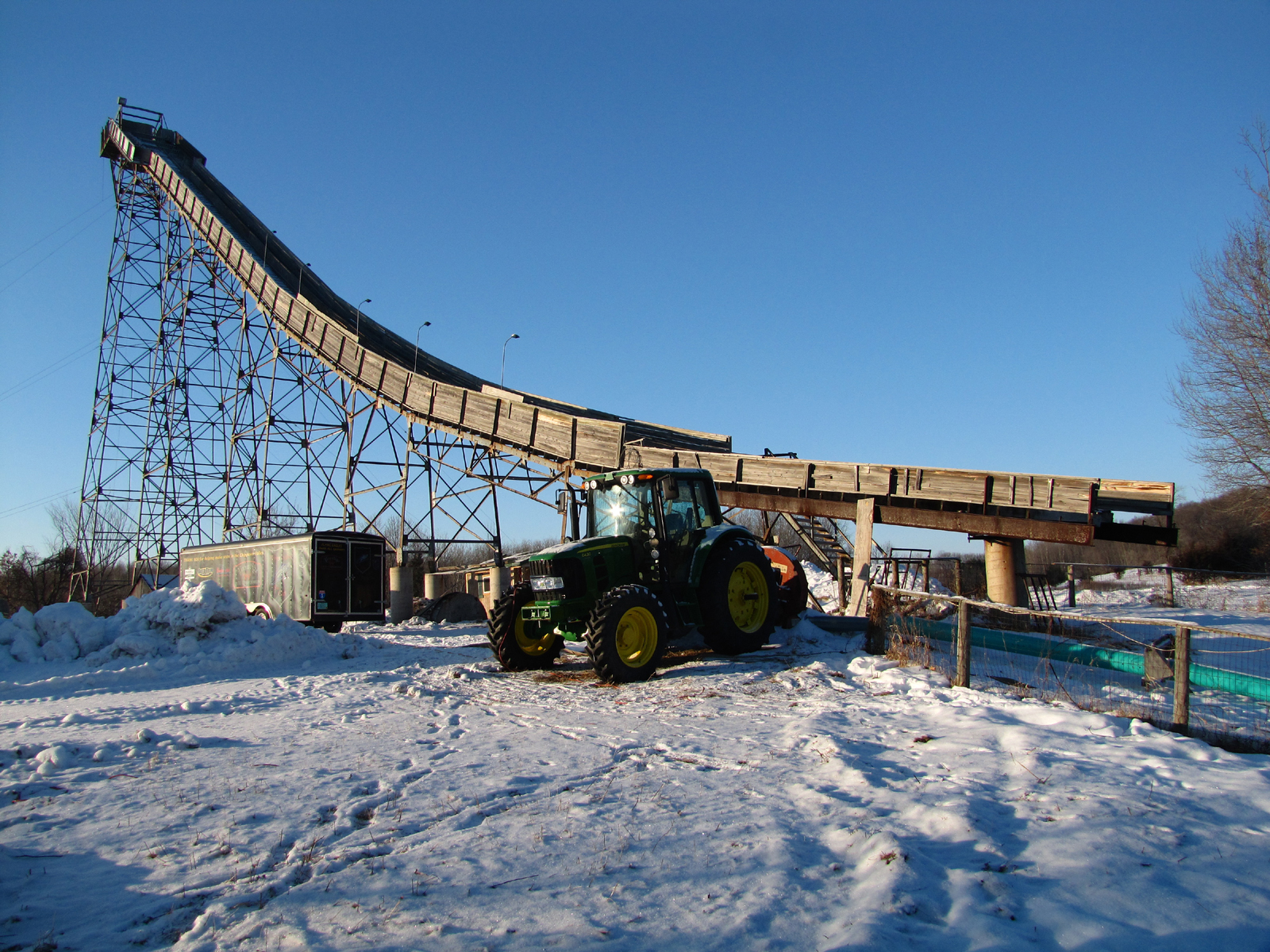
Silver Mine Ski-Jump, Eau Claire

== Parks and recreation ==
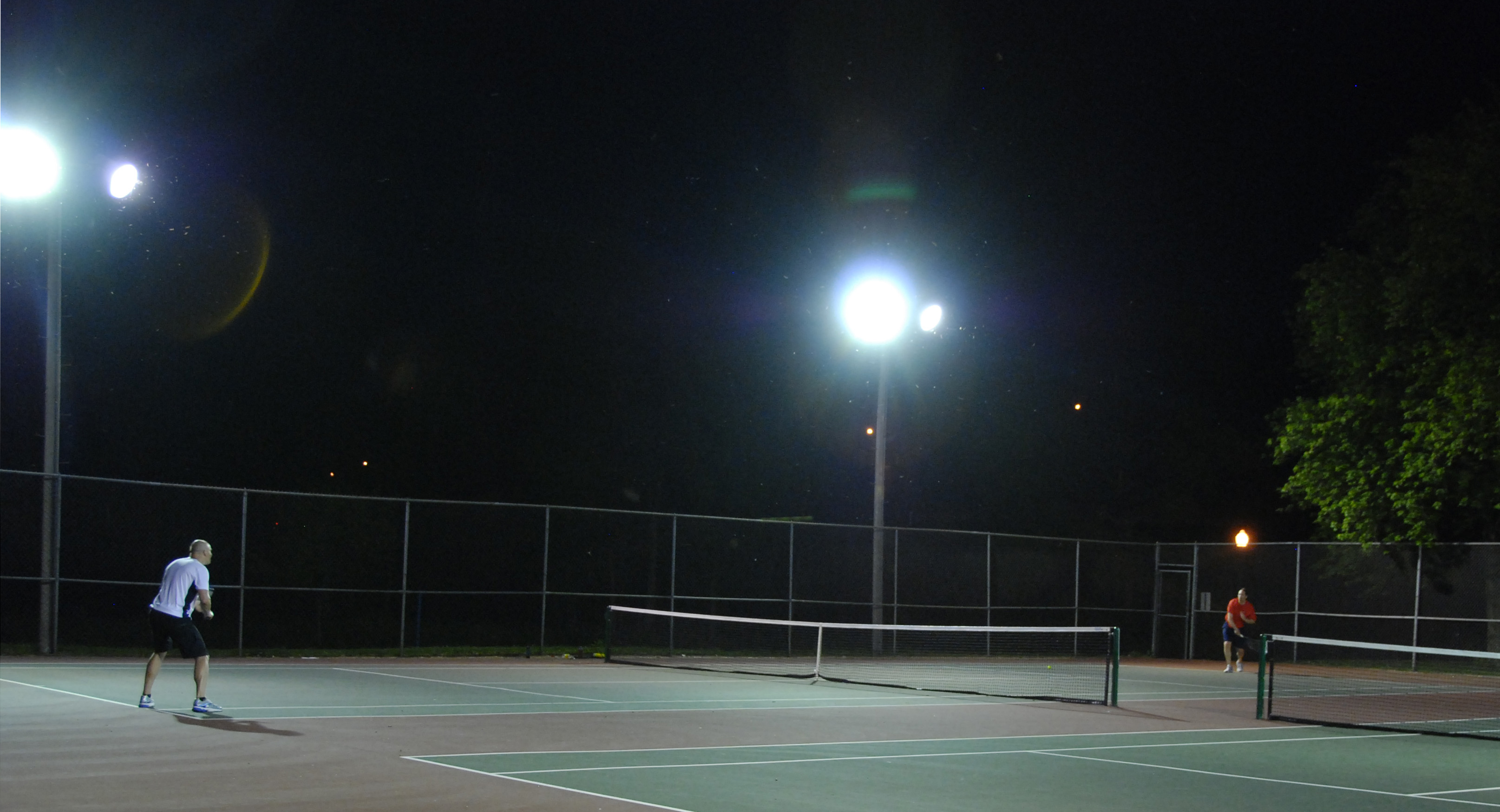
The lit tennis courts in Owen Park, near the UWEC campus.

There are several large parks in the city: Owen Park, along the Chippewa River, is home to a large bandshell, where open-air concerts are held throughout the summer; Putnam Park, which follows the course of Putnam Creek and Little Niagara Creek east from the UWEC campus; Carson Park, situated in the middle of an oxbow lake (better known as Halfmoon Lake); and Phoenix Park on the site of the old Phoenix Steel plant at the confluence of the Eau Claire and Chippewa Rivers. Phoenix Park hosts a weekly farmers market and open-air concerts during the summer. Riverview Park is a common summer swimming destination and one of the local boat landings. It has picnicking areas, grills, and public restrooms. There are also two dog parks in Eau Claire: Otter Creek Off-Leash Dog Park and Sundet Off-Leash Dog Park.

The City of Eau Claire also operates Fairfax public pool and Hobbs Municipal Ice Center, an indoor ice center.

Eau Claire is at the head of the Chippewa River State Trail, a biking and recreation trail that follows the lower course of the Chippewa River.

Many pedestrian bridges over the rivers

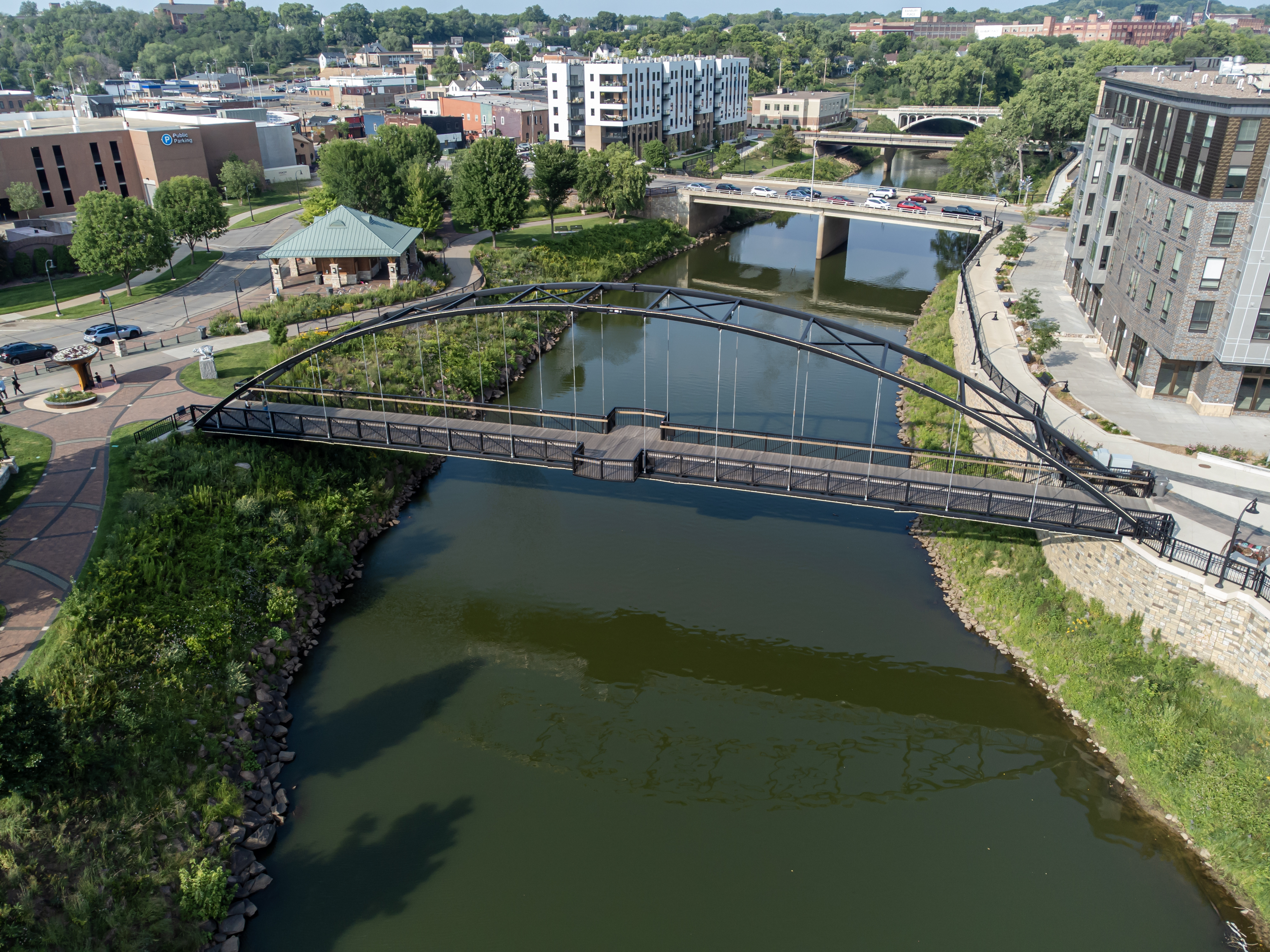
Phoenix Park over Eau Claire River

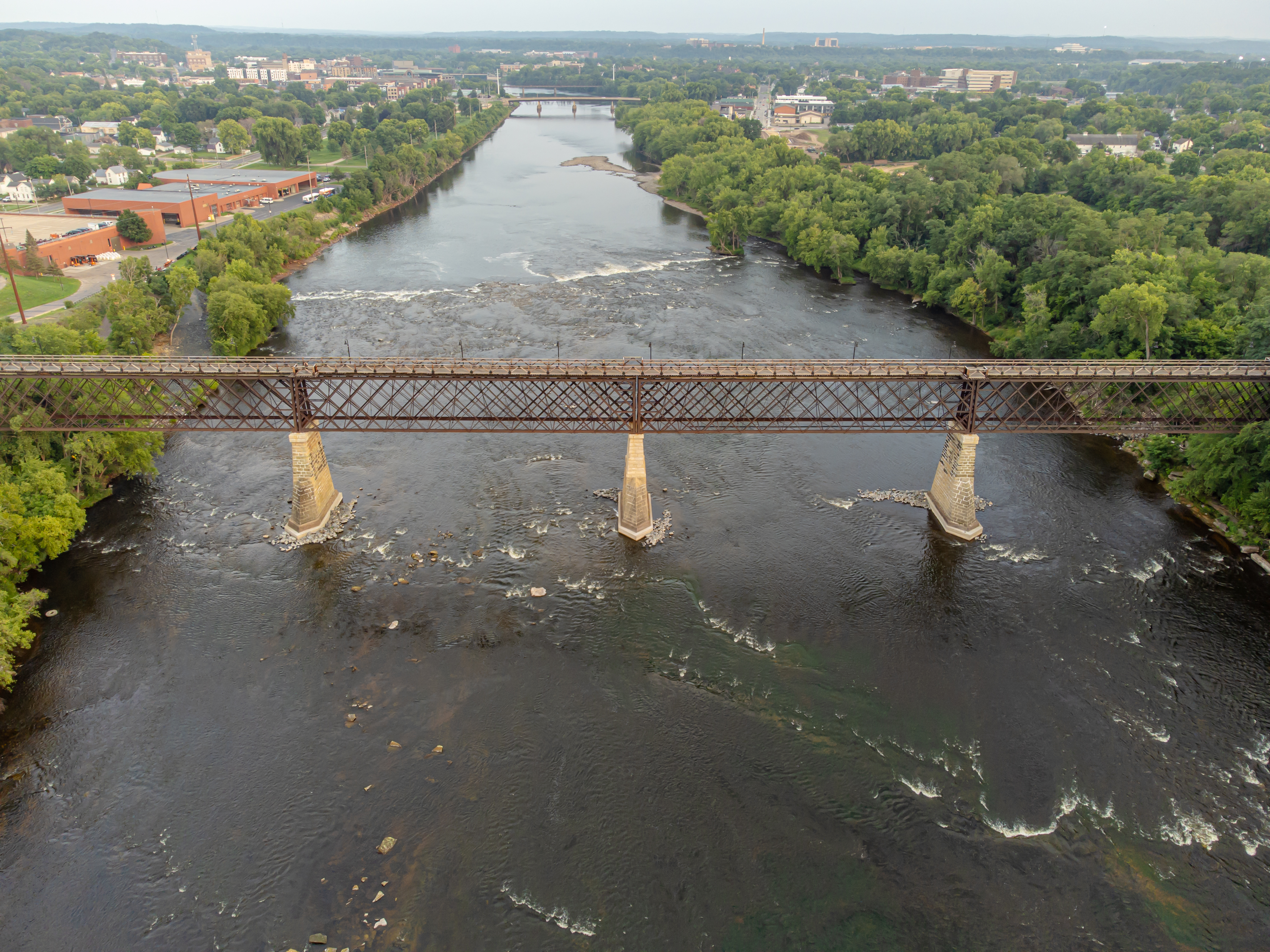
High Bridge over Chippewa River

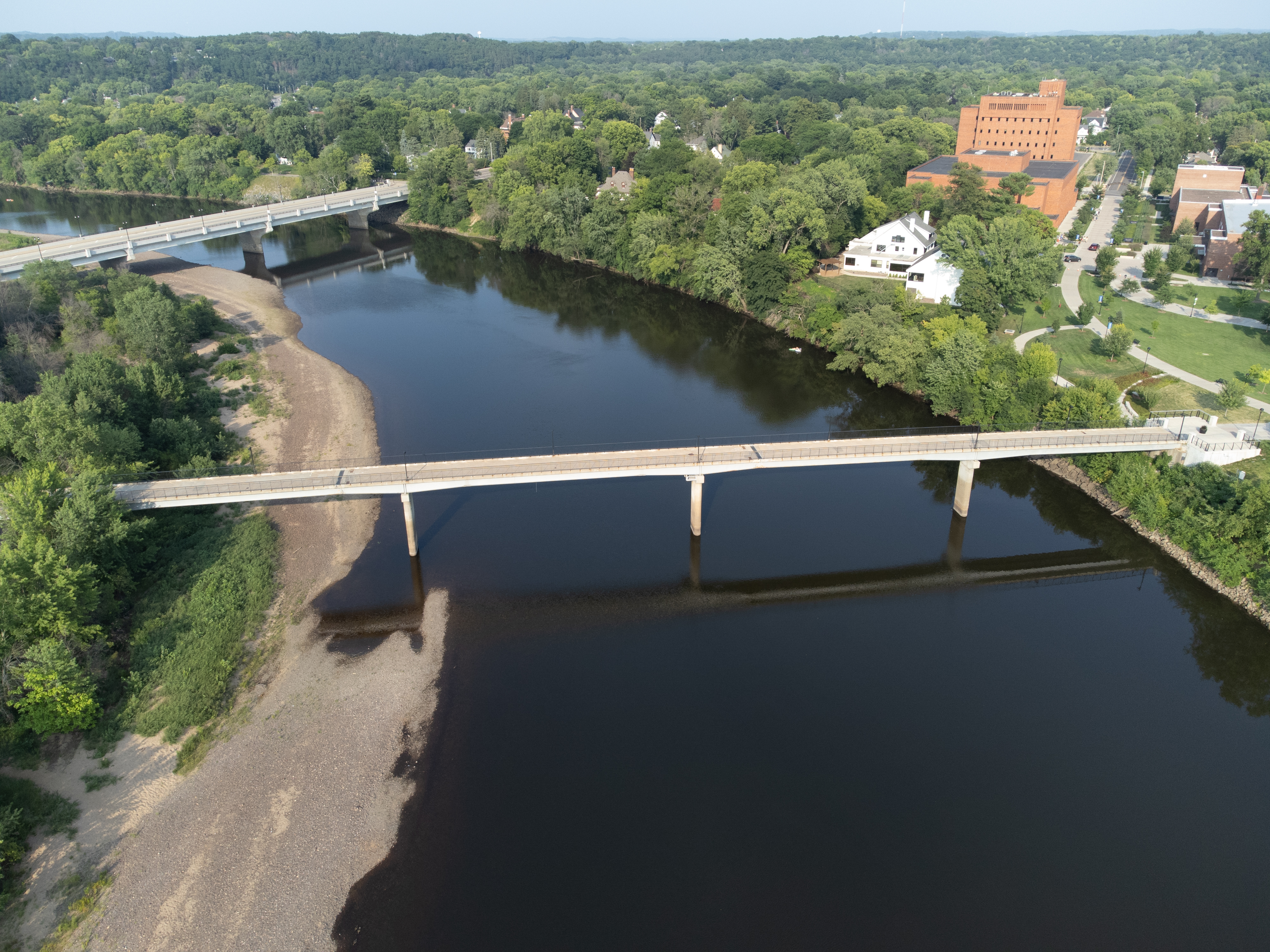
UWEC footbridge

Eau Claire is sometimes called the City of Bridges. There are fourteen road bridges and seven pedestrian bridges over the Eau Claire and Chippewa Rivers. Eau Claire is also home to the Eau Claire Marathon, a Boston Marathon qualifier.

== Government ==
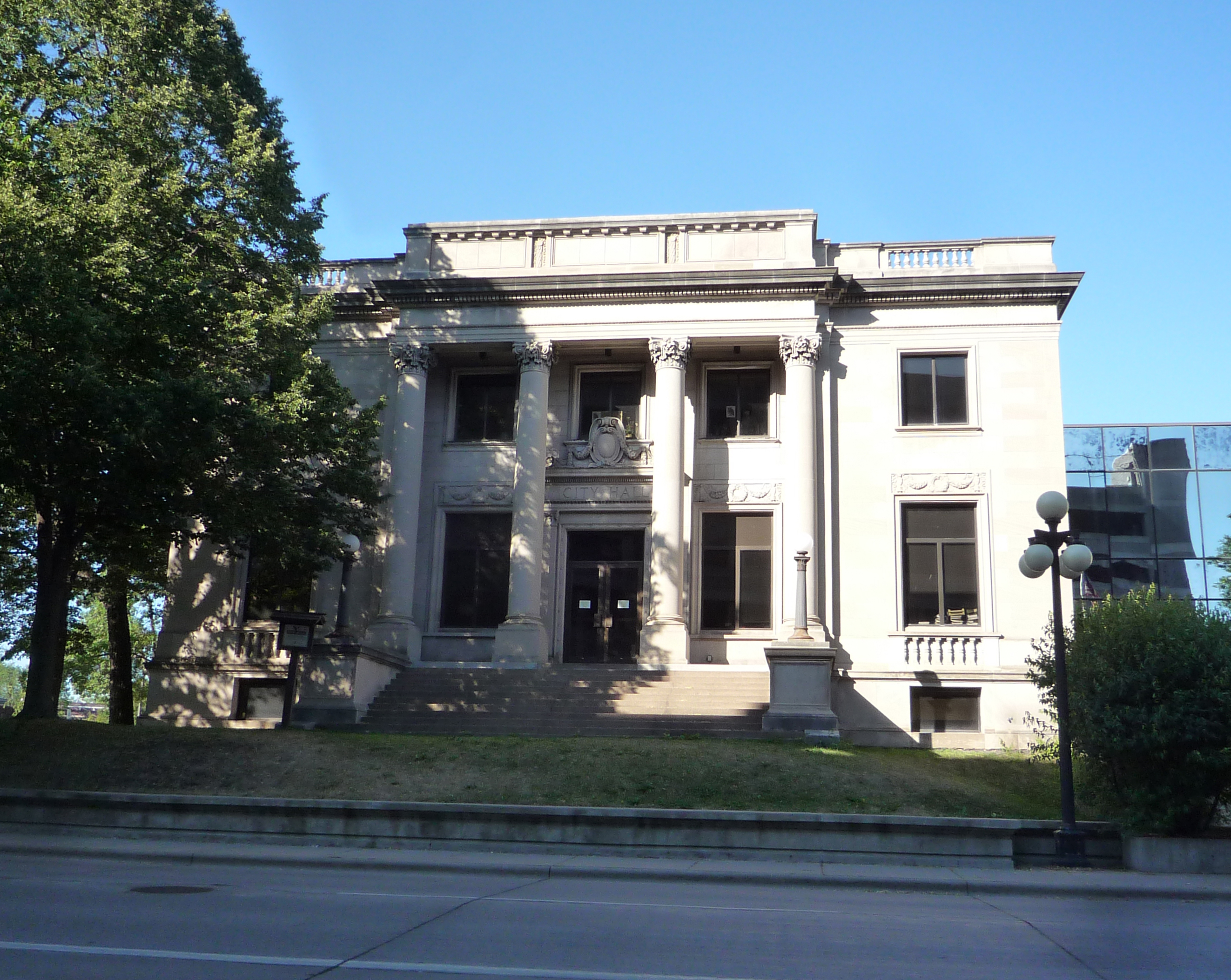
City Hall, designed by Eau Claire resident George Awsumb in 1915, is on the National Register of Historic Places.

In November 1909 a movement to change the city government from the aldermanic to the commission form was launched by the West Side Boosters, the forerunners of the Water Street, Eau Claire Business Men. The campaign that preceded the February 15 election was heated. Local rallies and mass meetings were held. The 20 members of the common council were about equally split about the change. The final vote was 1,867 for change and 995 against.

Since switching from a mayoral system in 1948, Eau Claire has had a city manager-city council form of government. The city council is a nonpartisan 11-member governing council consisting of five members elected from aldermanic districts in odd-numbered years, five members elected at large in even-numbered years, and an elected city council president, elected at large in odd-numbered years.

The council's legislative meetings are held on the second and fourth Tuesday of each month. Public hearings are held on the Monday evenings before legislative sessions. All meetings are held in the City Council Chambers at City Hall in downtown Eau Claire. Meetings are televised live on public-access television channel 97 and digital cable channel 994 and simulcast on radio station WRFP 101.9 FM.

Eau Claire is represented by Derrick Van Orden in the United States House of Representatives, and by Ron Johnson and Tammy Baldwin in the United States Senate. Jeff Smith represents Eau Claire in the Wisconsin Senate, and Jodi Emerson and Christian Phelps in the Wisconsin State Assembly.

Presidential elections results

Presidential elections results
Year	Republican	Democratic	Third parties
2024	38.0% 15,297	60.9% 24,491	1.1% 448
2020	37.2% 13,765	60.3% 22,268	2.5% 924
2016	37.2% 13,526	54.1% 19,648	8.7% 3,162
2012	38.6% 14,105	59.5% 21,714	1.9% 680
2008	34.8% 12,980	63.5% 23,701	1.7% 634
2004	41.4% 15,541	57.3% 21,511	1.3% 473
2000	41.0% 13,168	52.4% 16,854	6.6% 2,112

== Education ==
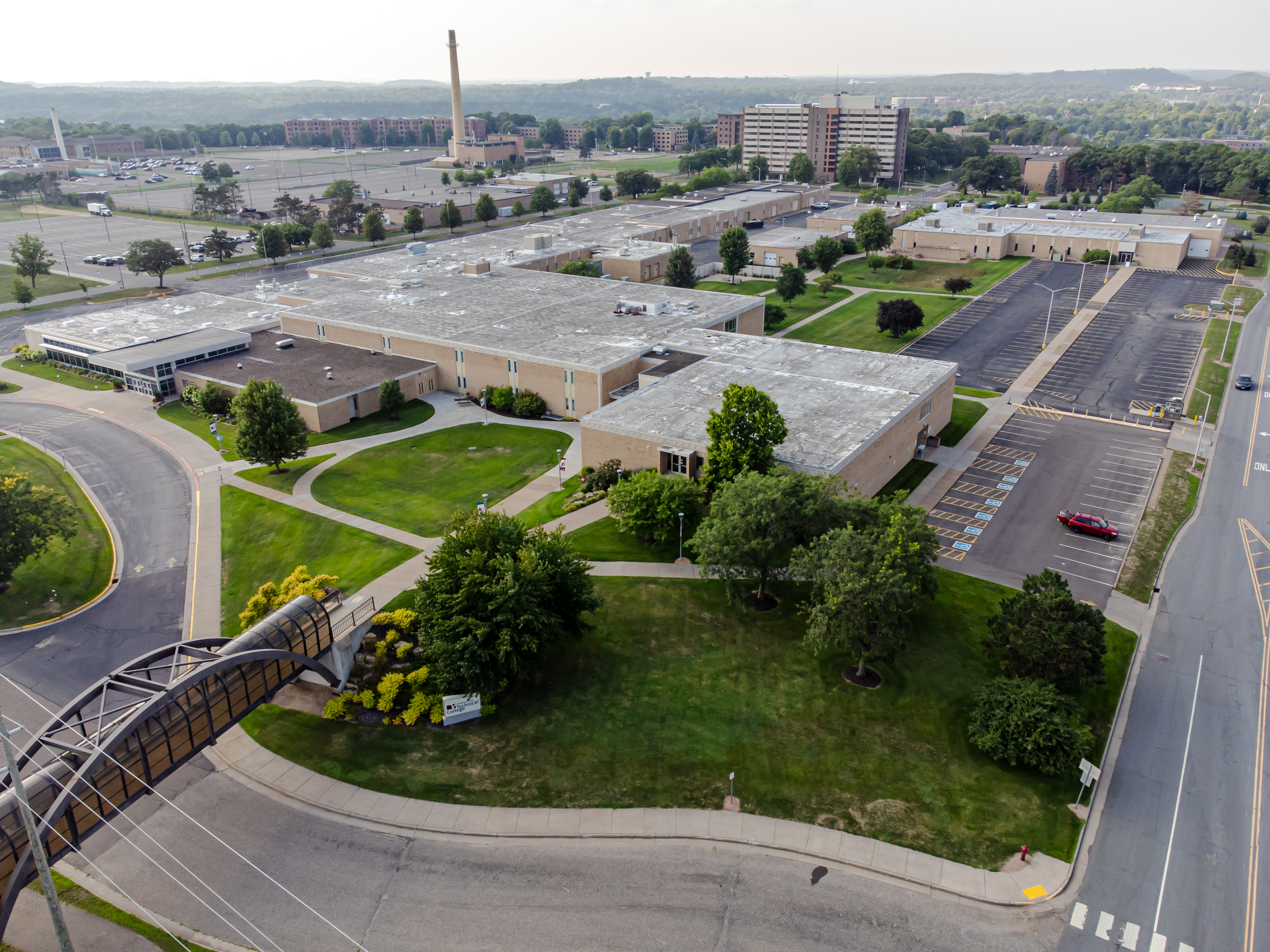
Chippewa Valley Technical College

Eau Claire schools are part of the Eau Claire Area School District. The city has two public high schools: Memorial High School and North High School; and two public charter high schools: McKinley Charter School and Technology Charter School. There are 13 elementary schools and three middle schools in the Eau Claire Area School District. In addition, there is the Chippewa Valley Montessori Charter School, which follows the teaching of Maria Montessori. Eau Claire also has two private high schools: Regis High School and Immanuel Lutheran High School.

Eau Claire is home to two public colleges (University of Wisconsin–Eau Claire and the Chippewa Valley Technical College) and a private college (Immanuel Lutheran College).

Eau Claire is home to two libraries: McIntyre Library on the University of Wisconsin-Eau Claire campus and L.E. Phillips Memorial Public Library. L.E. Phillips Memorial Public Library holds many events, such as children's storytimes, book clubs and makerspace labs.

== Media ==
=== Print ===
The Eau Claire Leader-Telegram is published five days a week (the Friday edition has extra weekend content), and dates to 1881. Volume One is a biweekly magazine with a circulation of 15,000 and an estimated readership of 45,000.

=== Television ===
Nielson Market Research lists Eau Claire/ La Crosse as the 127th largest television market area.

Channel	Callsign	Affiliation	Branding	Subchannels		Owner
(Virtual)	Callsign	Affiliation	Branding	Channel	Programming	Owner
8.1	WKBT; W18FK-D	CBS	News 8 Now	8.2; 8.3; 8.4; 8.5; 8.6	News 8+ Ion; Dabl; QVC; HSN	Morgan Murphy Media
13.1	WEAU	NBC	WEAU 13 News	13.2; 13.3; 13.4; 13.5; 13.6; 14.10	Cozi TV; MeTV; Movies! Ion Plus; Outlaw TV; The CW	Gray Television
14.1	WECX-LD; W33DH-D	The CW	Eau Claire - La Crosse CW	14.2; 14.3; 14.4; 13.10	Heroes & Icons; Start TV; MeTV; NBC	Gray Television
18.1	WQOW	ABC	WQOW 18	18.2; 18.3; 18.4; 18.5	Catchy Comedy; MeTV Toons; Court TV; True Crime	Allen Media Broadcasting
26.1	W26FG-D	NBC	WEAU 13 News	26.1	NBC	Edge Spectrum Inc.
28.1	WHWC	PBS	PBS Wisconsin	28.2; 28.3; 28.4	Wisconsin Ch. Create; PBS Kids	Wisconsin Educational Communications Board
48.1	WEUX	FOX	FOX 25/48	48.2; 48.3; 48.4	Antenna TV; Ion Mystery; Bounce	Nexstar Media Group
53.1	W23FC-D	365BLK		53.2; 53.3; 53.4; 53.5; 53.6	BlackVision; TimelessTV; Defy; Fubo Sports; NBC CRMZ	Innovate Corp.

=== Cable ===
The primary cable television provider franchise in Eau Claire is currently held by Spectrum (Charter).

Channel	Callsign	Branding	Programming	Owner
(varies)	CVCTV	CTV	Local Access	Valley Media Works/ City of Eau Claire
(varies)	CVCTV	NewsWorks	Public Affairs	Valley Media Works/ City of Eau Claire

Additionally, TDS Telecom holds fiber overbuild rights also offers MVPD service to parts of the city.

=== Radio ===
FM

FM radio stations
Frequency	Call sign	Name	Format	Owner
88.3 FM	WHWC	Wisconsin Public Radio	WPR News	Wisconsin Public Radio
88.7 FM	W204BP (KAWZ-FM Translator)	CSN International	Christian	CSN International
89.1 FM	W206AH (KLOV-FM Translator)	Family Radio	Christian	Family Radio
89.7 FM	WUEC	Wisconsin Public Radio	WPR Music	Wisconsin Public Radio
90.5 FM	WVCF	VCY America	Christian	VCY America
91.3 FM	WHEM	Moody Broadcasting Network	Christian	Moody Broadcasting Network
92.1 FM	WMEQ	Classic Rock 92.1	Classic rock	iHeartMedia, Inc.
92.9 FM	WECL	The X	Active Rock	Mid-West Family Broadcasting
94.1 FM	WIAL	I-94	Hot AC	Mid-West Family Broadcasting
95.1 FM	WQRB	B95	Country	iHeartMedia, Inc.
95.9 FM	W240DC (WEAQ-AM Translator)	The Farm 95.9	Classic country & Ag News/Talk	Mid-West Family Broadcasting
96.3 FM	WHYS	Eau Claire Community Radio	Community	Northern Thunder, Inc.
96.9 FM	WJLM	3ABN	Christian	3ABN
97.3 FM	WHRC	3ABN	Christian	3ABN
98.1 FM	WISM	Greatest Hits 98.1	Classic Hits	Mid-West Family Broadcasting
98.7 FM	W254CN (WBIZ-AM Translator)	98.7 The Fan	Sports	iHeartMedia, Inc.
99.1 FM	W256AE (WCFW-FM Translator)	105.7 Your Variety Station	Adult contemporary	Magnum Radio
99.9 FM	WGNW	The Family	Contemporary Christian	The Family Radio Network, Inc.
100.7 FM	WBIZ	Z100	Top 40/CHR	iHeartMedia, Inc.
101.9 FM	WRFP	Converge Radio	Community-Government	Eau Claire Public Access Center, Inc.
102.7 FM	WIEC	WIEC Fat Free Radio	Community	The Eau Claire Broadcasting Association
103.1 FM	W276CP (WOGO-AM Translator)	680 WOGO	News/Talk	Stewards of Sound, Inc.
103.7 FM	WWIB	103.7 WWIB	Christian	Stewards of Sound, Inc.
104.5 FM	WAXX	WAXX 104.5	Country	Mid-West Family Broadcasting
105.1 FM	W286CK (WAYY-AM Translator)	Sports Radio 105.1	Sports	Mid-West Family Broadcasting
105.7 FM	WCFW	105.7 Your Variety Station	Adult contemporary	Magnum Radio
106.3 FM	W292EG (WMEQ-AM Translator)	880 WMEQ	News/Talk	iHeartMedia, Inc.
106.7 FM	WATQ	Moose Country 106.7	Classic country	iHeartMedia, Inc.
107.9 FM	W300DB (WDVM-AM Translator)	Relevant Radio	Catholic	Starboard Broadcasting

AM

AM radio stations
Frequency	Call sign	Name	Format	Owner
680 AM	WOGO	680 WOGO	News/Talk	Stewards of Sound, Inc.
790 AM	WAYY	Sports Radio 105.1	Sports	Mid-West Family Broadcasting
880 AM	WMEQ	880 WMEQ	News/Talk	iHeartMedia, Inc.
1050 AM	WDVM	Relevant Radio	Catholic	Starboard Broadcasting
1150 AM	WEAQ	The Farm 95.9	Classic country & Ag News/Talk	Mid-West Family Broadcasting
1400 AM	WBIZ	98.7 The Fan	Sports	iHeartMedia, Inc.

== Transportation ==
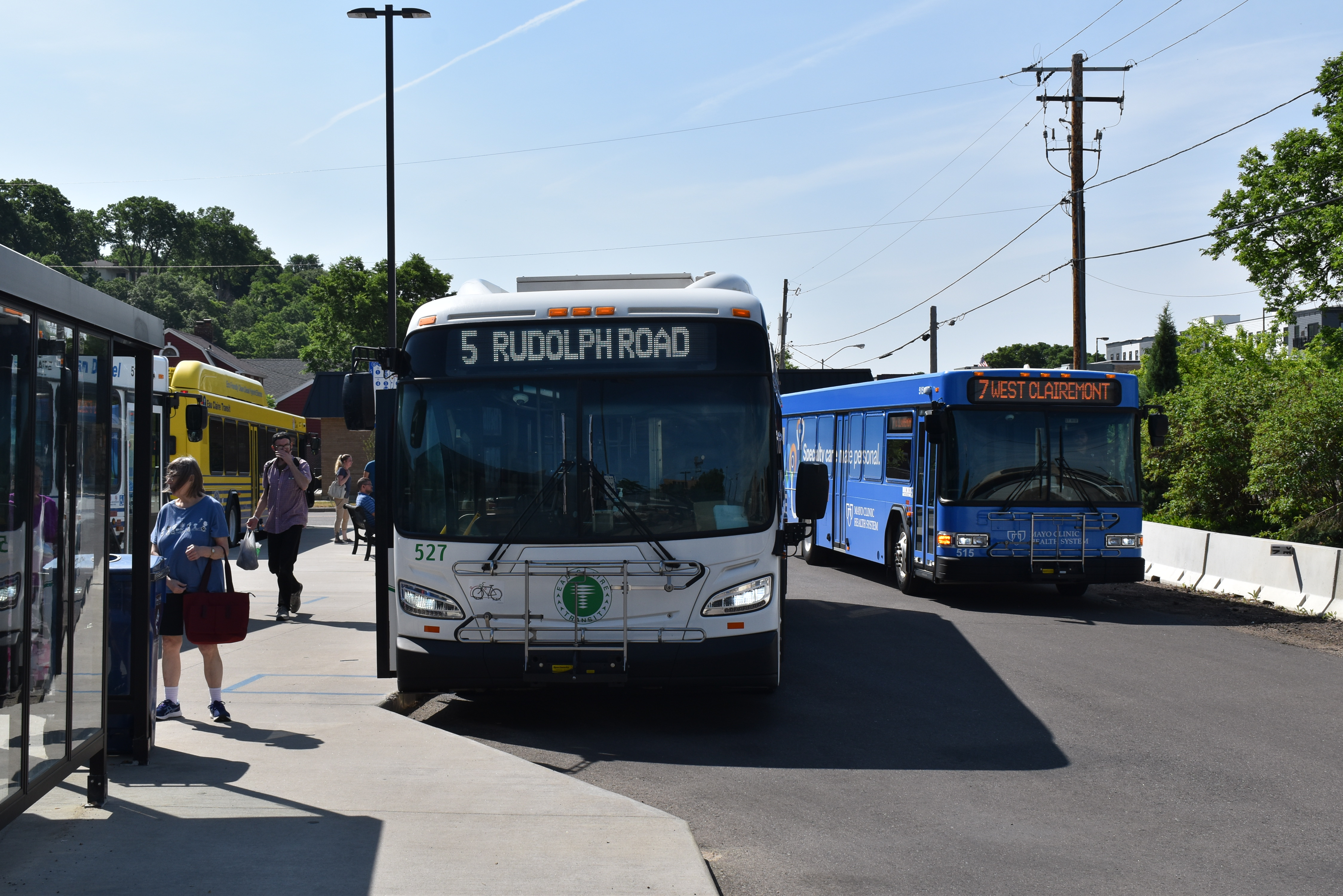
Eau Claire Transit buses at the downtown transit center in June 2023

=== Airports ===
Eau Claire is served by the Chippewa Valley Regional Airport (IATA: EAU, ICAO: KEAU).

=== Mass transit ===
- Eau Claire Transit bus services

=== Intercity bus ===
- Flixbus (Chicago to Minneapolis via I-94)
- Greyhound Lines (Chicago to Minneapolis via I-94)
- Megabus operated by Wisconsin Coach Lines (Milwaukee to Minneapolis via Green Bay)

=== Major highways ===
- Interstate 94
- U.S. Route 12 ("Clairemont Avenue")
- U.S. Route 53 ("The Bypass")
- Business US-53 ("Hastings Way")
- Highway 29 (bypasses Eau Claire to the north)
- Highway 37 ("Hendrickson Drive")
- Highway 85 (terminates on Wis. 37 just outside Eau Claire)
- Highway 93
- Highway 124 (foreshortened in 2006, now ends in neighboring Lake Hallie)
- Highway 312 (signed as, and known locally as, the "North Crossing")

=== Rail ===
Eau Claire is on freight rail lines owned by the Union Pacific Railroad, formerly owned by the Chicago, St. Paul, Minneapolis and Omaha Railway (Omaha Road), and later part of the Chicago and North Western Railway. C&NW operated passenger trains from Chicago through Eau Claire to the Twin Cities area until 1963, when the Twin Cities 400 ended service. Eau Claire station opened in 1893 and closed with the end of C&NW service. It was demolished in 1987. Passenger rail service to Eau Claire is seen as critical by the Minnesota Department of Transportation and Wisconsin Department of Transportation, and they plan to return trains to the city by 2030. In March 2021, Amtrak unveiled plans to bring a passenger service to Eau Claire as part of a larger route that would connect Eau Claire to Chicago, Milwaukee, Madison and Milwaukee-to-St. Paul.

== Healthcare ==
Mayo Clinic Health System's Eau Claire location, which has a level 2 trauma rating and serves as the regional trauma center, offers a family medicine residency program. It was also named the #4 best hospital in Wisconsin and recognized as a Best Regional Hospital in northwestern Wisconsin. Eau Claire also has one other hospital which has a level 3 trauma rating, Marshfield Medical Center. Both hospitals offer various specialty care units and services.

== Sister cities ==
Eau Claire's sister cities are:

- Lismore, Australia
- Miramar District, Costa Rica

== See also ==
- Eau Claire-Chippewa Falls metropolitan area
- Eau Claire, Calgary – a neighborhood in Calgary, Alberta (Canada), whose name was derived from a relocated Eau Claire sawmill
- List of municipalities in Wisconsin by population
- List of Tree Cities USA
