= Emery Street Bungalow District =

Historic district in Wisconsin, United States

- U.S. National Register of Historic Places
- U.S. Historic district
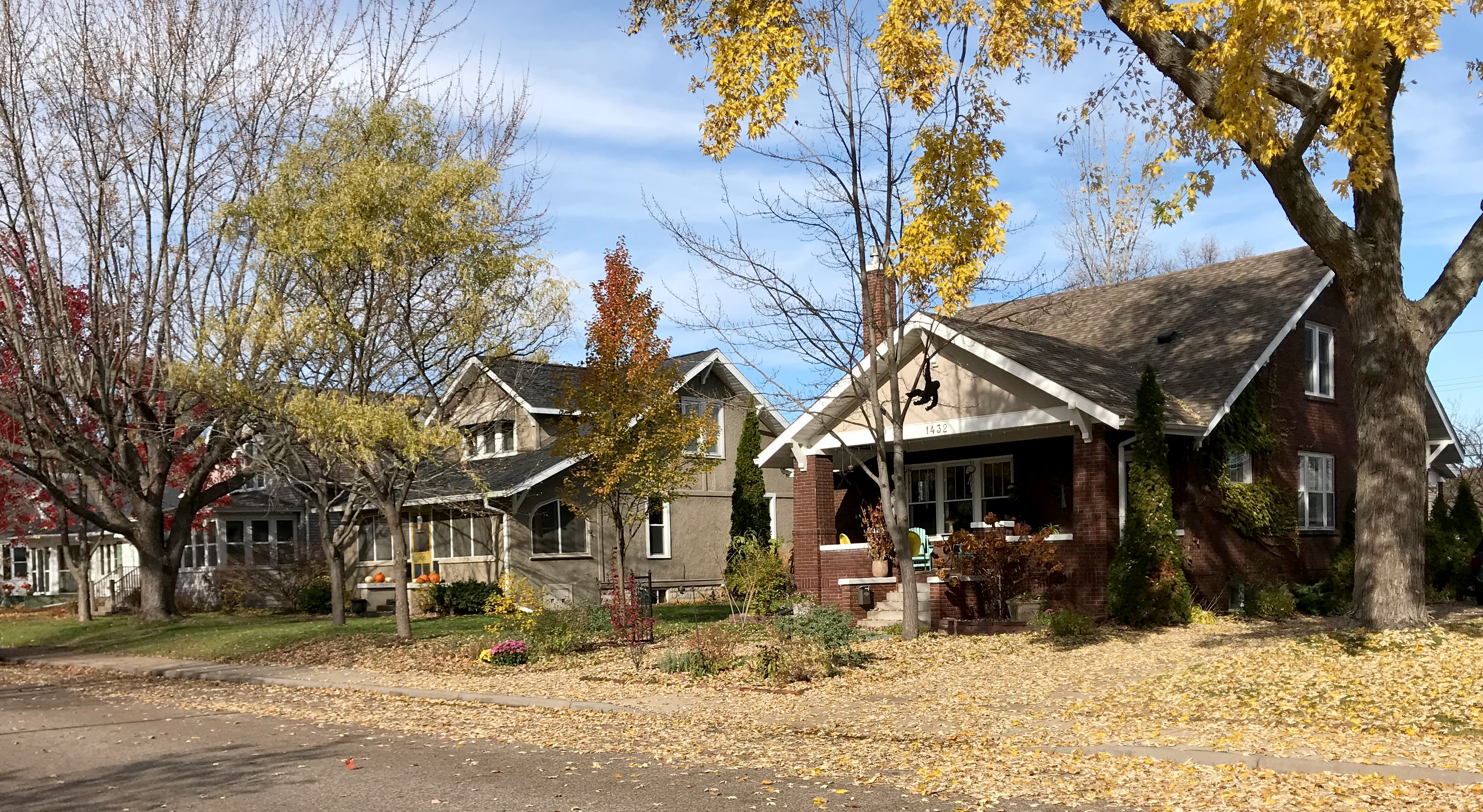

- Location within Wisconsin Location within the United States
- Location: Eau Claire, Wisconsin
- Coordinates: 44.81087°N 91.47977°W
- NRHP reference No.: 83003382
- Added to NRHP: May 20, 1983

The Emery Street Bungalow Historic District is located in Eau Claire, Wisconsin, United States. It was added to the National Register of Historic Places in 1983.

== History ==
Contributing buildings in the district were constructed from 1915 to 1930.
