= Eau Claire station (Wisconsin) =

Historic railroad station in Wisconsin, U.S.

Eau Claire
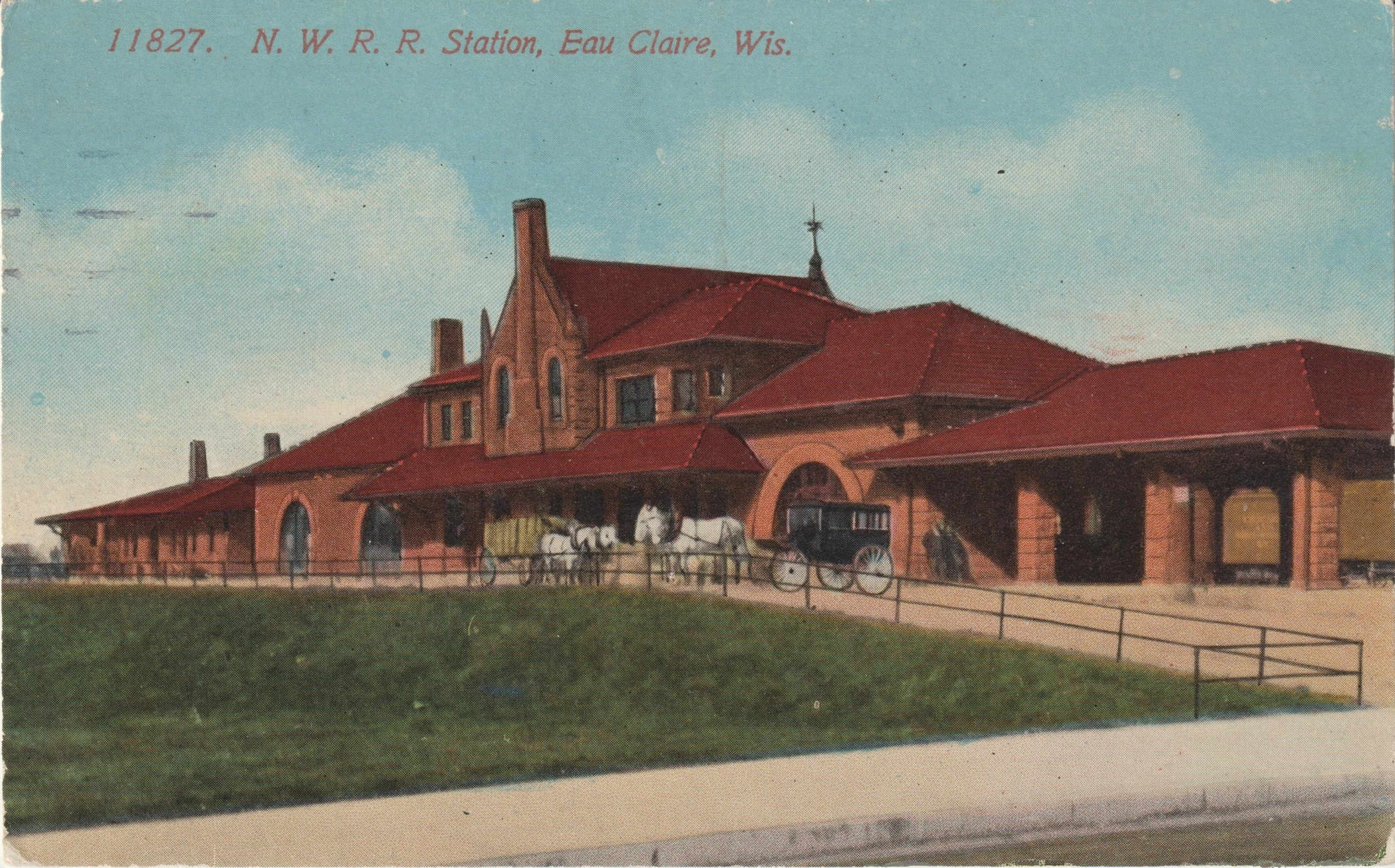
- A postcard view of the depot

General information
- Location: 324 Putnam St., Eau Claire, Wisconsin

History
- Opened: 1893
- Closed: 1963

Former services
Preceding station	Chicago and North Western Railway	Following station
Elk Mound toward Minneapolis	Chicago – Minneapolis via Milwaukee	Altoona toward Chicago
Elk Mound toward Minneapolis	Chicago – Minneapolis via Madison	Altoona toward Chicago
- Chicago, St. Paul, Minneapolis & Omaha Railroad Depot
- U.S. National Register of Historic Places
- Location within Wisconsin Location within the United States
- Location: 324 Putnam St., Eau Claire, Wisconsin
- Coordinates: 44°49′00″N 91°29′47″W
- Area: 1 acre (0.40 ha)
- Built: 1893
- Architect: Charles Sumner Frost
- Architectural style: Richardsonian Romanesque
- NRHP reference No.: 85003383
- Added to NRHP: October 24, 1985
Location

The Eau Claire station, otherwise known as the Chicago, St. Paul, Minneapolis & Omaha Railroad Depot was a historic railroad station located at 324 Putnam Street in Eau Claire, Wisconsin. The station was built in 1893 for the Chicago, St. Paul, Minneapolis & Omaha Railroad, a subsidiary of the Chicago and North Western Railway. The depot was designed by Charles Sumner Frost in the Richardsonian Romanesque style utilizing Lake Superior brownstone. Passenger service on the line was ceased in 1963.

The depot was added to the National Register of Historic Places on October 24, 1985. However, despite the depot being demolished in 1987, it continues to be listed on the NRHP.
