= First Methodist Episcopal Church (Eau Claire, Wisconsin) =

Historic church in Wisconsin, United States

- U.S. National Register of Historic Places
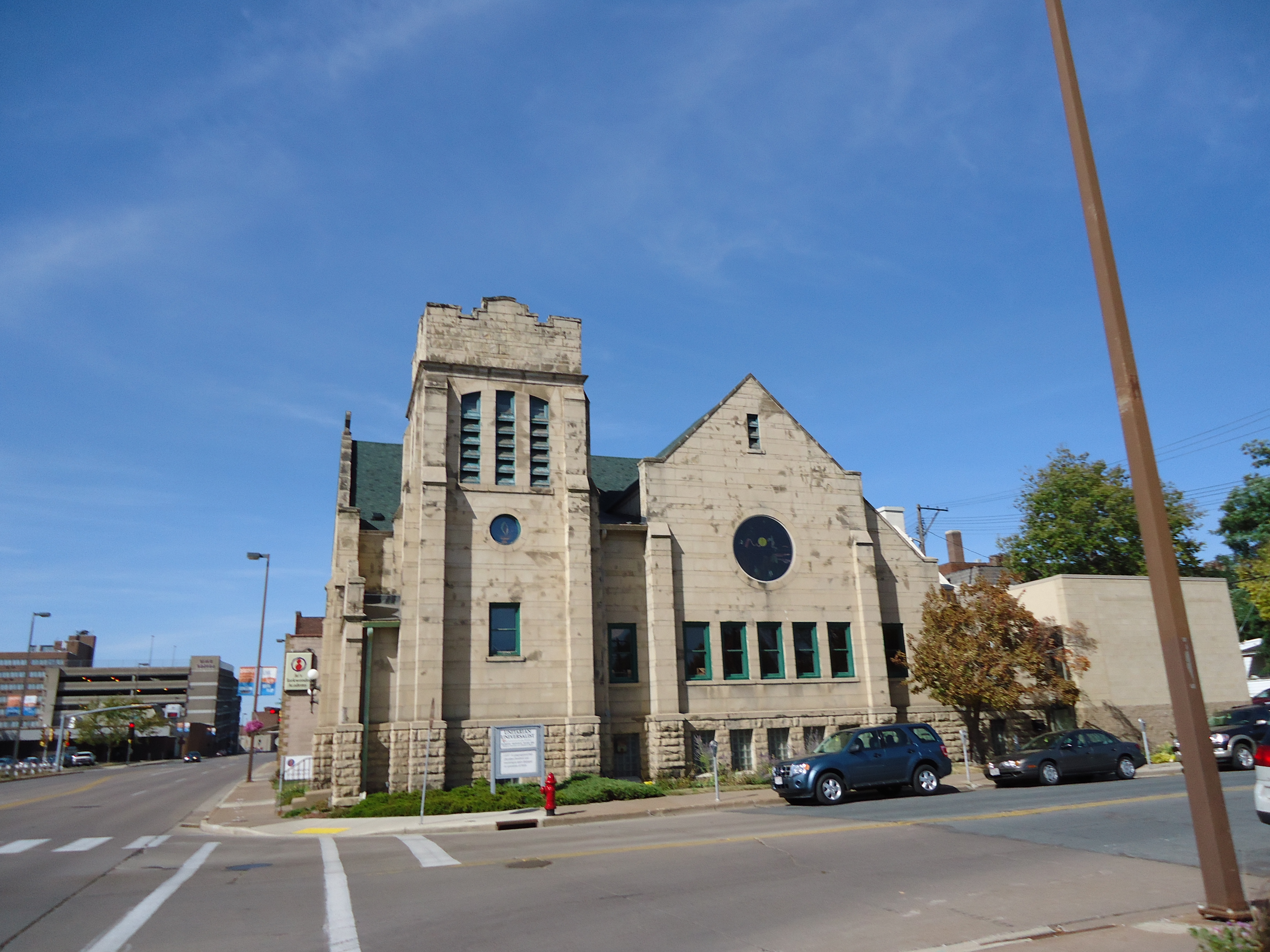

- Location within Wisconsin Location within the United States
- Location: 421 S. Farwell St. Eau Claire, Wisconsin
- Coordinates: 44°48′37″N 91°29′48″W
- Built: 1911
- Architect: James E. Fisher
- Architectural style: Gothic Revival
- NRHP reference No.: 99000241
- Added to NRHP: February 18, 1999

First Methodist Episcopal Church is a Neogothic Revival-styled church built in 1911 in Eau Claire, Wisconsin. It was added to the National Register of Historic Places in 1999 for its architectural significance.

The congregation that became First Methodist Episcopal began meeting in 1857, praying in the home of D.S. Hastings. Between 1863 and 1868, they built a wooden church on S. Barstow, and it served them until it burned in 1909. After the fire they met for two years in the Masonic Temple, until their new church (the subject of this article) was complete in 1911.

The 1911 building was designed by William Linley Alban and James E. Fisher of St. Paul and built by Samuel Converse and Company for $30,000, seating 650. The floor-plan is cross-gabled with a 3-story square tower in the corner. A foundation of rock-faced limestone supports walls of smooth-cut limestone blocks. Angle buttresses reinforce the corners, and the walls of the gable ends extend as parapets above the roof. One gable peak is topped with a cross. Features that mark the Neo-Gothic Revival style are the Gothic transoms over the doors, the steeply pitched roofs, and the irregular massing. Inside, some things have been changed, but the original pneumatic pipe organ built by W.W. Kimball and Company of Chicago still sits at the front of the sanctuary.

In 1930, First Methodist Episcopal merged with Lake Street Episcopal Church and moved to the larger building on Lake Street. The building was bought by Immanuel Lutheran, a Swedish Evangelical Lutheran congregation which had been founded in 1883. By 1930 they had outgrown their building on Oxford Ave. and Fulton Street, so bought First Episcopal's building. Immanuel stayed from 1931 to 1981, then sold it to the Unitarian Fellowship.
