= Water Street Historic District (Eau Claire, Wisconsin) =

Historic district in Wisconsin, United States

- U.S. National Register of Historic Places
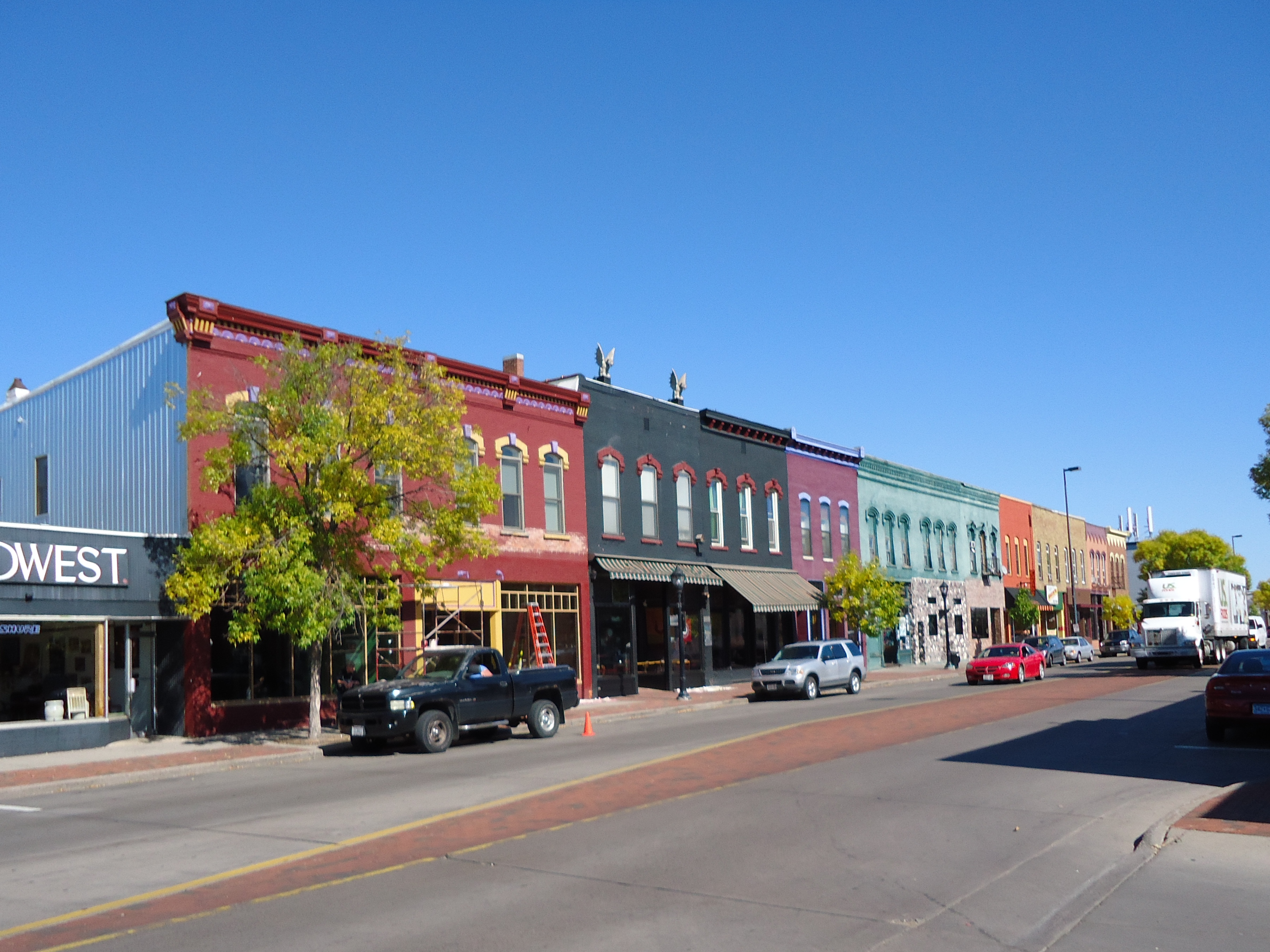
- Location: Eau Claire, Wisconsin
- Coordinates: 44.8022°N 91.50823°W
- NRHP reference No.: 07001086
- Added to NRHP: October 11, 2007

The Eau Claire Water Street Historic District was added to the National Register of Historic Places in 2007.

== Description ==
Contributing buildings in the district were constructed from 1882 to 1885. Records remain of buildings on Water Street dating back at least as far as 1857, one year after the founding of West Eau Claire, about one half mile to the north. It is located directly across from the main campus of the University of Wisconsin-Eau Claire.
