= Riverview Park (Eau Claire, Wisconsin) =

Urban park in Eau Claire, Wisconsin, United States

- Interactive map of Riverview Park
- Type: Urban park
- Location: 2712 Riverview Dr, Eau Claire, Wisconsin, 54703 United States
- Coordinates: 44.843797°N 91.497874°W
- Area: 33-acre (13 ha)
- Owner: City of Eau Claire, Wisconsin

Riverview Park, is a park located on the Chippewa River in Eau Claire, Wisconsin, on the north side of the city. The park also incorporates an island in the Chippewa River.

== Facilities ==
Riverview Park offers three pavilions for picnics and parties, all of which offer grilling facilities, seating accommodations and access to electricity; 3 miles (4.8 km) of track for walking or bicycling; and a boat landing.

The park is open year-round, and also offers playground and public bathrooms. Cross-country skiing is allowed in winter. The picnic shelter and bathroom facilities ere built in 1971.

In 2020 the Eau Claire City Council announced $2M worth of improvements to the park.
