= Silver Spring Foods =

World's largest producer of horseradish

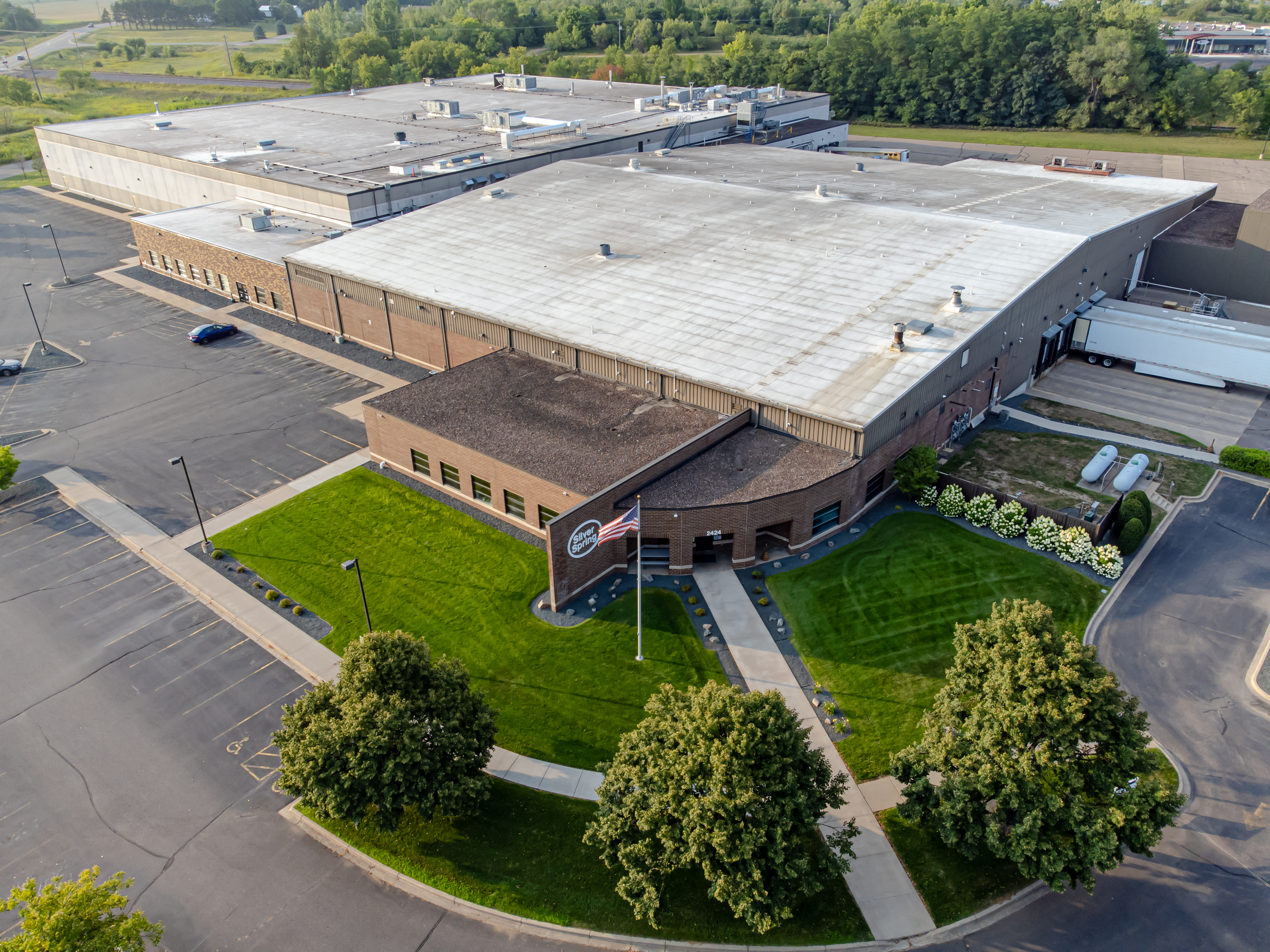
- Type: Public
- Industry: Fast-moving consumer goods
- Founded: Eau Claire, Wisconsin, USA (1929)
- Founder: Ellis Huntsinger
- Area served: Worldwide
- Key people: Nancy Bartusch (Owner)
- Products: Horseradish; Condiments; Mustard; Sauces
- Number of employees: 256
- Website: SilverSpringFoods.com

Silver Spring Foods, Inc., is the world's largest grower and producer of horseradish. Founded in 1929, the company is based in Eau Claire, Wisconsin and also produces an assortment of sauces and mustards. The company was incorporated in 1949 as Silver Spring Gardens.

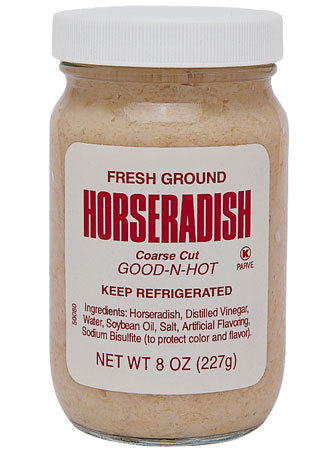
Silver Spring Foods, Inc. Fresh Ground Horseradish

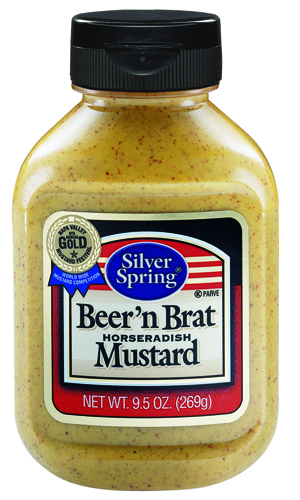
Silver Spring Foods, Inc. Beer'n Brat Mustard

== History ==
In 1929, Ellis Huntsinger started growing horseradish and other crops in Eau Claire, Wisconsin. In the early days, he prepared and bottled horseradish by hand. By 1937, Ellis had industrialized his farming operation and further commercialized the horseradish business after purchasing Becky Gardens and renaming "Silver Spring Gardens" after a clearwater spring on the property. In 1941, Huntsinger discovered that the addition of dairy cream helped further enhance the flavor, heat, and longevity of prepared horseradish. This discovery helped him expand his horseradish sales to markets throughout the United States. Silver Spring Gardens was incorporated around 1950 by Ellis and his son Eugene Huntsinger along with son-in-law Ed Bartusch.

The company has been family-owned since it began. It is currently owned by Ellis Huntsinger's granddaughter, Nancy Bartusch and her two sons.

In 1972, president Edwin Bartusch and his wife, Betty, died in a plane crash. Barbara, the younger of their two daughters, and her husband also died in the crash, leaving the couple's 22-year-old daughter Nancy to run the company. She enlisted the help of family friend Bill Nelson Sr., who resigned from Kraft Foods to run the company. His son Bill Nelson Jr. took over a few years later and ran the company for 25 years. In 1999 Silver Spring Gardens began scaling up through the acquisition of Philadelphia-based company Bookbinder's, Inc.

Around 2000, the company started producing specialty mustards with horseradish as a key ingredient.

In 2003, the company lost a major client, and 30 percent of its business. By 2006, it had gained back enough market share to complete a new, highly automated, 100,000 square foot plant that doubled production capacity. In anticipation of the expanded production capacity, the company bought the Waldorf, Nuevo Sol and Bella Migliore brands of jams and sauces in October 2005. In January 2006, Silver Spring completed the purchase of Thor-Shackel Horseradish Co., the producer of Thor's Hot Horseradish and several other brands.

In 2009, the company purchased Kelchner's Horseradish Products of Dublin, Pennsylvania. In 2010 the company moved Kelchner's production to its plant in Eau Claire, Wisconsin, keeping open Kelchner's headquarters and a shipping operation in Pennsylvania. In 2011, the company began expanding the area where Kelchner's products were sold: south into the Carolinas and north into New York and Massachusetts. The company would go on to acquire Atlantic Brand seafood condiments, and in 2020 the president of Silver Spring Foods, Inc. was approached by the owner of Brede Foods with the prospect of buying his brand. Brede is the latest acquired of the company's now five brands.

== Awards ==
The company and has earned several awards at mustard competitions, with Silver Spring Beer ’n Brat Mustard winning top awards. At the 2010 Napa Valley Mustard Festival's World-Wide Mustard Competition, Silver Spring earned a Grand Champion title for its popular Deli Style Mustard, while its Picante Pepper Mustard took home a bronze in the Pepper Hot category. Additionally, its Beer ’n Brat Horseradish Mustard nabbed a bronze in the Horseradish/Wasabi category, and its Organic Deli Mustard won the silver in the Organic category.

The company regularly places in the annual World-Wide Mustard Competition hosted by America's National Mustard Museum. In 2021 Silver Spring's Beer'n Brat Mustard took the silver medal in the Horseradish/Wasabi mustard category and their Chipotle Mustard received a bronze medal in the Pepper Hot Mild-Medium category.

== Operations ==
Silver Spring Foods, Inc., is now the world's largest producer and processor of horseradish products. Revenue hit $50 million in 2011, and the company now employs over 250 people.

Silver Spring Foods manufacturing facility produces over 100 million pounds of condiments per year. Capabilities include hot and cold processing and filling, Kosher, Certified Organic, Non-GMO project verified, and ability to produce a wide variety of gluten free condiments. Silver Spring Foods, Inc. maintains a AA rating with the British Retail Consortium, a voluntary auditing program.

The brands of the parent company, Huntsinger Companies also include Huntsinger Farms, Inc., Bookbinder's Food Products, Atlantic Seafood Products, Kelchner Food Products, and Brede Foods.
