= WWIB =

Coordinates: 45°06′07″N 91°09′33″W

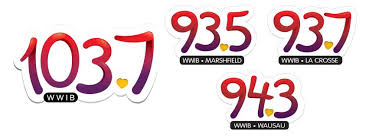
- Hallie, Wisconsin; United States
- Broadcast area: Eau Claire-Chippewa Falls
- Frequency: 103.7 MHz

Programming
- Format: Christian adult contemporary

Ownership
- Owner: Stewards of Sound Inc.

History
- First air date: December 30, 1972

Technical information
- Licensing authority: FCC
- Facility ID: 63428
- Class: C1
- ERP: 100,000 Watts
- HAAT: 207 m (679 ft)

Links
- Public license information: Public file; LMS
- Webcast: Listen Live
- Website: www.wwib.com

WWIB 103.7 FM is a radio station in the United States that broadcasts a Christian adult contemporary music format. Licensed to Hallie, Wisconsin, WWIB serves the Eau Claire - Chippewa Falls area and reaches northward to the Hayward area. It is also heard locally in La Crosse through a translator on 93.7 FM, in Marshfield on 93.5 FM, and in Wausau on 94.3 FM. The station began broadcasting December 30, 1972.

== Translators ==
Call sign	Frequency	City of license	FID	ERP (W)	Class	FCC info
K229BH	93.7 FM	La Crosse, Wisconsin	141273	41	D	LMS
W228DH	93.5 FM	Marshfield, Wisconsin	37814	80	D	LMS
K232BE	94.3 FM	Wausau, Wisconsin		5	D	
