= Sacred Heart Church (Eau Claire, Wisconsin) =

Historic church in Wisconsin, United States

- U.S. National Register of Historic Places
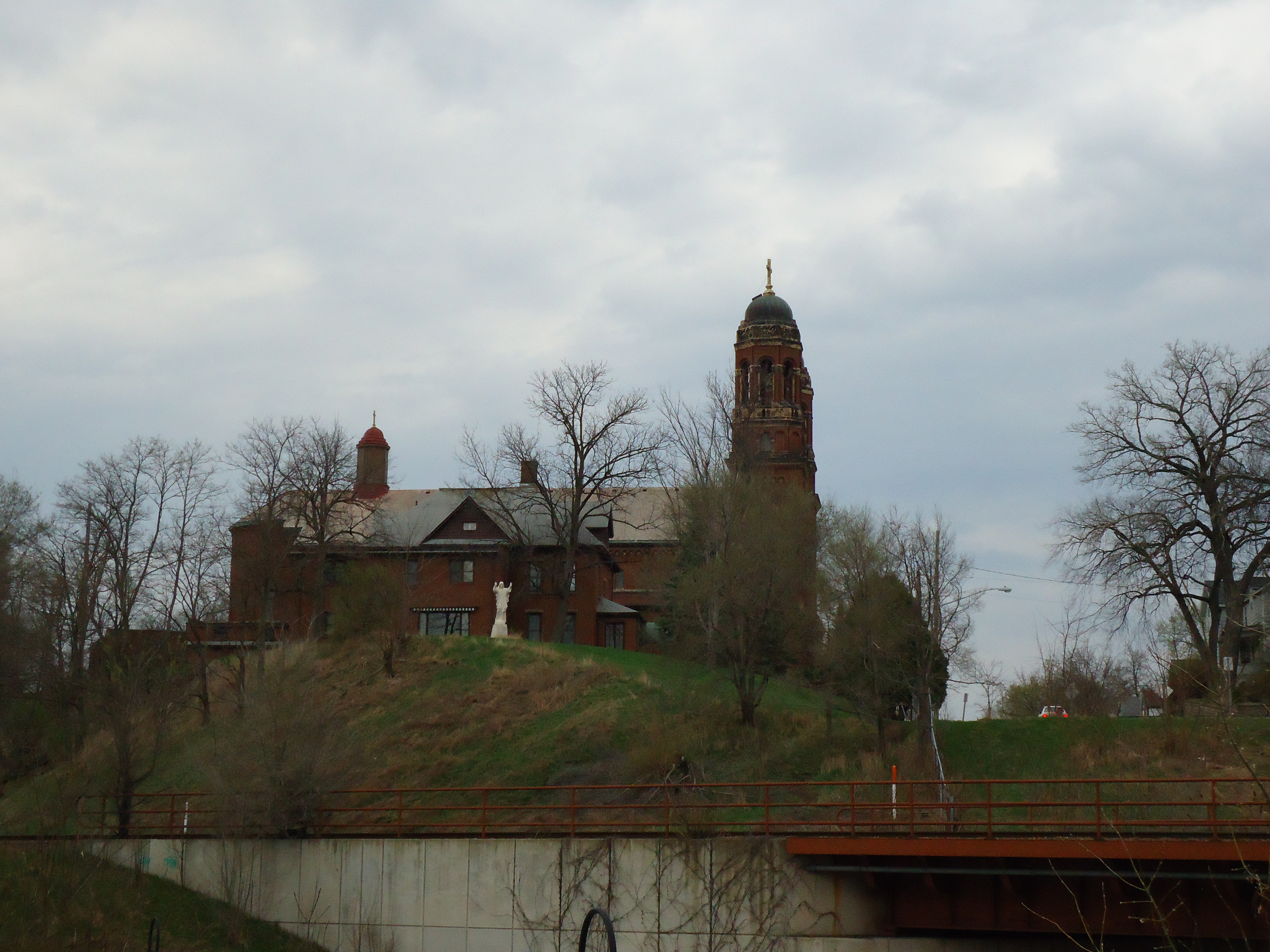
- Location: 418 N. Dewey St. Eau Claire, Wisconsin
- Coordinates: 44.81822°N 91.49968°W
- Built: 1928
- NRHP reference No.: 83003391
- Added to NRHP: March 3, 1983

Sacred Heart Church is located in Eau Claire, Wisconsin. It was added to the National Register of Historic Places for its architectural significance in 1983. The parish was organized around 1875 when a number of German-speaking families formed a parish distinct from St. Patrick's. The first building was a wooden frame structure, but a brick church was built in 1880 and a school was built in 1910, also from brick. Sacred Heart Hospital, founded in 1889 and located about half a block north of the church, was also part of the campus.

In 1928, the current building was built. It is a locally significant example of Neo-Romanesque architecture, and the imposing building is a prominent feature of the city center. It has identical twin towers, an oversized rose window, and many round arched openings. The structure has an apsidal shape, and the interior has side aisles lining the nave. The twin towers are mirror images of each other, which contrasts with the more common unmatched towers in this architectural style.
