= National Register of Historic Places listings in Eau Claire County, Wisconsin =

Location of Eau Claire County in Wisconsin

This is a list of the National Register of Historic Places listings in Eau Claire County, Wisconsin. It is intended to provide a comprehensive listing of entries in the National Register of Historic Places that are located in Eau Claire County, Wisconsin. The locations of National Register properties for which the latitude and longitude coordinates are included below may be seen in a map.

There are 65 properties and districts listed on the National Register in the county. Another property was once listed but has been removed.

This National Park Service list is complete through NPS recent listings posted August 28, 2026.

== Current listings ==
	Name on the Register	Image	Date listed	Location	City or town	Description
1	Brady Anderson and Waldemar Ager House	Brady Anderson and Waldemar Ager House	March 16, 2000 (#00000190)	514 W. Madison St. 44°48′57″N 91°30′50″W	Eau Claire	Carpenter Brady Anderson built this ornate Victorian house between 1892 and 1894 for his own family. Norwegian-American writer Waldemar Ager bought the house in 1903, and wrote and raised his family there.
2	James Barber House	James Barber House	January 28, 1983 (#83003374)	132 Marston Ave. 44°48′15″N 91°29′45″W	Eau Claire	Tudor Revival house designed by Harry Wild Jones and built around 1904. Barber was an executive of the Northwestern Lumber Company, involved in other Eau Claire businesses, and a defendant in a case about logging public land in Idaho that went to the Supreme Court.
3	Barnes Block	Barnes Block	January 22, 1982 (#82000665)	15-21 S. Barstow St. 44°48′46″N 91°30′04″W	Eau Claire	1893 Romanesque Revival building, also known as Chippewa Valley Bank, and Cameron-Drummond-Slagsvold Building.
4	Martin Van Buren Barron House	Martin Van Buren Barron House	January 28, 1983 (#83003375)	221 Washington St. 44°48′15″N 91°29′33″W	Eau Claire	Carpenter Gothic house built in 1871 for Barron, who operated an early flour and feed store, then worked for the Rust-Owen lumber company.
5	Einar and Alice Borton House	Einar and Alice Borton House	July 23, 2013 (#13000541)	1819 Lyndale Avenue; 44°48′23″N 91°28′31″W	Eau Claire	Lustron house, (inexpensive, prefabricated, enameled-steel) built in 1949. Einar was a teller at American National Bank and Trust.
6	Orlando Brice House	Orlando Brice House	January 28, 1983 (#83003376)	120 Marston Ave. 44°48′14″N 91°29′47″W	Eau Claire	Georgian Revival home of an executive of the Wisconsin Refrigerator Company, built 1918.
7	California Wine and Liquor Store	California Wine and Liquor Store	March 1, 1982 (#82000666)	201 Farmers St. 44°36′03″N 90°57′55″W	Fairchild	1896 brick commercial building.
8	Carson Park Baseball Stadium	Carson Park Baseball Stadium	July 25, 2003 (#03000698)	Carson Park Dr., Carson Park; 44°48′26″N 91°31′14″W	Eau Claire	The stadium, constructed as a WPA project in 1936 from Downsville sandstone, hosted the Eau Claire Bears and a young Hank Aaron.
9	Clarence Chamberlin House	Clarence Chamberlin House	January 27, 2000 (#99001726)	322 W. Grand Ave. 44°48′31″N 91°30′22″W	Eau Claire	Chamberlin came to Eau Claire in 1856 as a salesman for the Ingram and Kennedy Lumber company. He built this house in 1881 in Second Empire style. After a fire he added Queen Anne and Classical Revival elements.
10	Pearl and Eva Chambers House	Pearl and Eva Chambers House	January 12, 2012 (#11001027)	1615 State St. 44°47′54″N 91°29′41″W	Eau Claire	1928 Colonial Revival home. Pearl was the vice-president of the New Dells Lumber Company.
11	Chicago, St. Paul, Minneapolis, and Omaha Railway Bridge	Chicago, St. Paul, Minneapolis, and Omaha Railway Bridge	September 4, 2024 (#100010789)	Over the Chippewa River, south of the Dells Dam; 44°49′56″N 91°30′43″W	Eau Claire	900-foot long six-span deck truss bridge built in 1881 for the Chicago, St. Paul, Minneapolis and Omaha Railway by Leighton Bridge & Iron Works. Called the "High Bridge" because it crosses 82 feet above the water. Served as a spur until 1992. Now a pedestrian bridge.
12	Chicago, St. Paul, Minneapolis & Omaha Railroad Depot	Chicago, St. Paul, Minneapolis & Omaha Railroad Depot	October 24, 1985 (#85003383)	324 Putnam St. 44°49′00″N 91°29′47″W	Eau Claire	Brownstone depot of the Chicago, St. Paul, Minneapolis and Omaha Railway, designed by Charles Sumner Frost Richardsonian Romanesque style and built in 1893. Now demolished.
13	Christ Church Cathedral and Parish House	Christ Church Cathedral and Parish House	January 28, 1983 (#83003377)	510 S. Farwell St. 44°48′33″N 91°29′48″W	Eau Claire	The Episcopal congregation built the Tudor Revival parish house in 1910. In 1916 they built the Gothic Revival church building, which was designed by Purcell & Elmslie.
14	City Hall	City Hall	January 28, 1983 (#83003378)	203 S. Farwell St. 44°48′44″N 91°29′54″W	Eau Claire	Eau Claire's second city hall, this Classical Revival/Beaux-Arts building, designed by George Awsumb, was built in 1916.
15	Cobblestone House	Cobblestone House	November 19, 1974 (#74000084)	1011 State St. 44°48′18″N 91°29′38″W	Eau Claire	1866 house with exterior of local cobblestones constructed in Gothic Revival style for stonemason Bradley Marcy.
16	Community House, First Congregational Church	Community House, First Congregational Church	July 18, 1974 (#74000085)	310 Broadway; 44°48′19″N 91°30′22″W	Eau Claire	Prairie School church hall built in 1915, designed by Purcell & Elmslie with touches of Gothic Revival style. The building was funded by Cornelia Ingram, wife of a local lumber baron and member of the Congregational church.
17	Confluence Commercial Historic District	Confluence Commercial Historic District	October 3, 2007 (#07001047)	2-28 S Barstow; 206-316 Eau Claire & 8 S Farwell Sts. 44°48′46″N 91°30′04″W	Eau Claire	Point of origin of city of Eau Claire, at the confluence of the Eau Claire and Chippewa rivers, with contributing buildings including the 1861 Kneer House hotel, the 1875 Derge cigar factory, and the 1893 grand Romanesque Revival Drummond-Cameron building.
18	Dells Mill	Dells Mill	December 24, 1974 (#74000086)	About 3 mi. NNW of Augusta off WI 27; 44°43′32″N 91°08′54″W	Augusta	The gristmill on Bridge Creek was built in 1864, when wheat was the cash crop in this part of Wisconsin.
19	Drummond Business Block	Drummond Business Block	October 10, 2007 (#07001084)	409-417 Galloway St. 44°48′54″N 91°30′05″W	Eau Claire	Built from 1879 to 1884, the buildings housed a meat-packing company, a wholesale grocer, and later the Farmers Store.
20	David Drummond House	David Drummond House	July 30, 1974 (#74000087)	1310 State St. 44°48′05″N 91°29′44″W	Eau Claire	Brick Queen Anne-styled house built in 1888 by Drummond, who started a meat-packing business, Eau Claire Gas and Light, a real estate business, and the Pioneer Furniture Company.
21	Eau Claire High School	Eau Claire High School	January 28, 1983 (#83003379)	314 Doty St. 44°48′43″N 91°29′47″W	Eau Claire	This Collegiate Gothic school, built in 1925, was Eau Claire's only public high school until 1957. Since 1982 it's been used as offices and storage for the school district.
22	Eau Claire Masonic Temple	Eau Claire Masonic Temple	November 14, 2007 (#07001197)	317-319 S Barstow & 306 Main Sts. 44°48′37″N 91°29′54″W	Eau Claire	Built in 1899, the former (1899-1927) Eau Claire Masonic Temple is now the Antique Emporium.
23	Eau Claire Park Company Addition Historic District	Eau Claire Park Company Addition Historic District	September 10, 2004 (#04000950)	Roosevelt, McKinley, and Garfield between Park Ave. and State St. 44°47′51″N 91°29′47″W	Eau Claire	38 contributing homes in various styles, ranging from the Dutch Colonial Revival Stokes home built in 1907 to a 1936 house in International Style on Roosevelt Ave. to Ranch-style houses built in the early 1950s.
24	Eau Claire Public Library	Eau Claire Public Library	January 28, 1983 (#83003380)	217 S. Farwell St. 44°48′43″N 91°29′53″W	Eau Claire	Carnegie library built in 1903. Designed in Classical Revival style by Patton & Miller.
25	Eau Claire Vocational School	Eau Claire Vocational School	November 12, 2014 (#14000917)	1300 1st Ave. 44°48′51″N 91°30′32″W	Eau Claire	3.5-story factory built in 1891, in which the Eau Claire Trunk Company made suitcases. The city converted it to a vocational school in 1941. Housed the city's Parks, Rec and Forestry department from 1968 to 2009.
26	Christine Eichert House	Christine Eichert House	January 28, 1983 (#83003381)	527 N. Barstow St. 44°49′07″N 91°30′08″W	Eau Claire	Queen Anne house built in 1897-98 for Eichert, a partner in the John Walter Brewing Company, and sister to John.
27	Emery Street Bungalow District	Emery Street Bungalow District	May 20, 1983 (#83003382)	Emery St. between Chauncey and Agnes Sts. 44°48′39″N 91°28′47″W	Eau Claire	Largely intact neighborhood of middle-class bungalow-style homes built between 1915 and 1930.
28	First Methodist Episcopal Church	First Methodist Episcopal Church	February 18, 1999 (#99000241)	421 S. Farwell St. 44°48′37″N 91°29′48″W	Eau Claire	The Neo-Gothic church, built in 1911, still contains its original Kimball and Company pipe organ.
29	Gilbert Gikling House	Gilbert Gikling House	January 16, 2001 (#00001668)	421 Talmadge St. 44°48′43″N 91°29′31″W	Eau Claire	Gikling worked in a lumber mill and for the Linderman Box and Veneer Company. He built this Queen Anne house in 1895.
30	James Stephen Hoover and Elizabeth Borland Memorial Chapel	James Stephen Hoover and Elizabeth Borland Memorial Chapel	January 7, 2000 (#99001662)	Lakeview Cemetery, Buffington Dr. 44°48′44″N 91°31′28″W	Eau Claire	Neo-Gothic cemetery chapel, constructed in 1936.
31	John Johnson Saloon		January 28, 1983 (#83003383)	216 Fifth Ave. 44°48′10″N 91°30′35″W	Eau Claire	Wooden "Boomtown" style tavern constructed in 1882. Now demolished.
32	Kaiser Lumber Company Office	Kaiser Lumber Company Office	January 28, 1983 (#83003384)	1004 Menomonie St. 44°48′05″N 91°31′12″W	Eau Claire	Brick commercial vernacular office built in 1905. Kaiser was the last lumber company established in Eau Claire. It subsumed the Daniel Shaw company, and operated sawmills, lumber kilns, a planing mill, a lath mill, and a box factory, operating from 1905 to 1939.
33	A. L. Kenyon House	A. L. Kenyon House	January 28, 1983 (#83003385)	333 Garfield Ave. 44°47′54″N 91°29′34″W	Eau Claire	Upscale bungalow built in 1915.
34	Kline's Department Store	Kline's Department Store	June 14, 1984 (#84003669)	6-10 S. Barstow St. 44°48′46″N 91°30′02″W	Eau Claire	Department store built in 1926 with elements of Commercial Gothic and Art Deco styles. Demolished in 2014
35	Levi Merrill House	Levi Merrill House	June 20, 1985 (#85001358)	120 Ferry St. 44°47′54″N 91°32′05″W	Eau Claire	1873 house mixing elements of Gothic Revival and Classical Revival styles. Merrill was a stonemason who owned the Mount Washington stone quarry, up the bluff behind the house.
36	Oatman Filling Station	Oatman Filling Station	January 16, 2001 (#00001669)	102 Ferry St. 44°47′56″N 91°32′05″W	Eau Claire	This 1931 house-type gas station was designed to blend into its suburban neighborhood.
37	Ottawa House	Ottawa House	January 28, 1983 (#83003386)	602 Water St. 44°48′08″N 91°30′42″W	Eau Claire	Wooden false front saloon and home constructed after the 1882 fire. May have catered to French-Canadian laborers from the lumber mills nearby. Demolished in 2022.
38	John S. Owen House	John S. Owen House	January 28, 1983 (#83003387)	907 Porter Ave. 44°48′20″N 91°29′46″W	Eau Claire	Colonial Revival home built in 1923 for Owen, one of Eau Claire's lumber barons.
39	Owen Park Bandshell	Owen Park Bandshell	September 2, 2003 (#03000896)	First Ave., Owen Park; 44°48′19″N 91°29′58″W	Eau Claire	Designed by Alex Garnock and built in 1938 by the WPA to accommodate the popularity of the Eau Claire Municipal Band, the bandshell was dedicated in 1992 to Donald I. "Sarge" Boyd in recognition of the profound influence his half century of musical leadership had on the cultural development of the Chippewa Valley.
40	Pioneer Block	Pioneer Block	August 27, 1980 (#80000134)	401-409 Water St. 44°48′07″N 91°30′28″W	Eau Claire	Gothic styled block of brick stores built in 1882.
41	Jane E. Putnam Memorial Chapel	Jane E. Putnam Memorial Chapel	January 7, 2000 (#99001663)	Forest Hill Cemetery, Emery St. 44°48′31″N 91°29′17″W	Eau Claire	Neo-Gothic-styled chapel in Forest Hill Cemetery built in 1908 by Jane and her husband, Henry C. Putnam, land agent and philanthropist.
42	Randall Park Historic District	Randall Park Historic District	May 20, 1983 (#83003390)	Roughly bounded by Lake and Niagara Sts., 3rd and 5th Aves. 44°48′18″N 91°30′23″W	Eau Claire	Early Eau Claire residential neighborhood, where both businessmen and laborers lived near the mills on Half Moon Lake.
43	Adin Randall House	Adin Randall House	January 28, 1983 (#83003389)	526 Menomonie St. 44°48′05″N 91°30′38″W	Eau Claire	Upright and Wing house built in 1862. Randall was an early settler and promoter of Eau Claire. He ran a ferry across the Chippewa, a planing mill, a sash and door factory, and invented the sheer boom to efficiently shunt logs into Half Moon Lake.
44	Roosevelt Avenue Historic District	Roosevelt Avenue Historic District	April 15, 2009 (#09000219)	415,419,429,443,449 & 455 Roosevelt Ave. 44°47′48″N 91°29′31″W	Eau Claire	Cluster of five houses built from 1929 to 1941 along Little Niagara Creek.
45	Sacred Heart Church	Sacred Heart Church	March 3, 1983 (#83003391)	418 N. Dewey St. 44°49′05″N 91°29′59″W	Eau Claire	Romanesque Revival church built in 1928 by Catholic congregation to replace earlier church buildings which had been on the site since around 1875.
46	Saint Edward's Chapel	Saint Edward's Chapel	January 7, 2000 (#99001661)	1129 Bellevue Ave. 44°49′01″N 91°29′29″W	Eau Claire	Neo-Gothic mission church building built 1889-1896 by the local Episcopal congregation. Converted to a home 1923-1926.
47	St. Joseph's Chapel	St. Joseph's Chapel	January 14, 1988 (#87002436)	Sacred Heart Cemetery, Omaha St. 44°49′27″N 91°28′50″W	Eau Claire	Gothic Revival chapel built in 1896 in Sacred Heart cemetery.
48	St. Patrick's Church	St. Patrick's Church	January 28, 1983 (#83003392)	322 Fulton St; 44°48′41″N 91°30′30″W	Eau Claire	Catholic church built in Gothic Revival style in 1885. Now the oldest remaining church in Eau Claire.
49	Salsbury Row House	Salsbury Row House	April 15, 2009 (#09000220)	302-310 W. Grand Ave. 44°48′31″N 91°30′19″W	Eau Claire	Wood-frame Victorian row house built in 1891. Owner lived in corner unit; others were rentals. Sole remaining row house in Eau Claire.
50	Schofield Hall	Schofield Hall	January 28, 1983 (#83003393)	105 Garfield Ave. 44°47′55″N 91°30′00″W	Eau Claire	Built around 1916 to house Eau Claire State Normal School, in Collegiate Gothic style. It was then called "Old Main." Today it's the administration building for UW-Eau Claire.
51	William and Tilla Schwahn House	William and Tilla Schwahn House	January 16, 2001 (#00001670)	447 McKinley Ave. 44°47′49″N 91°29′28″W	Eau Claire	1928 Georgian Revival home of Schwahn, part owner of a saddlery factory on Wisconsin Street.
52	Second Ward School	Second Ward School	January 7, 2000 (#99001664)	1105 Main St. 44°48′43″N 91°29′10″W	Eau Claire	Collegiate Gothic school built around 1916. Renamed "Boyd School" in 1951 and operated until 2002. Now apartments.
53	Soo Line Locomotive 2719	Soo Line Locomotive 2719	January 10, 1994 (#93001453)	Carson Park; 44°48′25″N 91°31′14″W	Eau Claire	Locomotive moved in 2006 to the Lake Superior Railroad Museum in Duluth, Minnesota
54	Soo Line Railroad Bridge	Soo Line Railroad Bridge	August 12, 2022 (#100007982)	Spans the Eau Claire R. between Galloway and Gibson Sts. 44°49′04″N 91°27′58″W	Eau Claire	442-foot steel Warren deck truss railroad bridge across the Eau Claire River, built in 1910 for the Soo Line by Minneapolis Steel and Machinery Co. The bridge follows an S-curve to join two parallel rail lines without any sharp bends. Now a pedestrian bridge.
55	Steven House	Steven House	March 1, 1982 (#82000667)	606 Second Ave. 44°48′22″N 91°30′13″W	Eau Claire	1909 Prairie School home designed by Purcell & Feick. J. D. R. Steven was part owner of Eau Claire Book and Stationary.
56	Temple of Free Masonry	Temple of Free Masonry	January 14, 1988 (#87002450)	616 Graham Ave. 44°48′27″N 91°29′53″W	Eau Claire	Built in 1927, the primary purpose of the Temple of Free Masonry, better known as the Masonic Center or Temple, has been to provide meeting space for the area's Masonic organizations. Since the mid-1990s, it has also served as the rain/rehearsal site for the Eau Claire Municipal Band.
57	Third Ward Historic District	Third Ward Historic District	May 20, 1983 (#83003394)	Roughly bounded by Chippewa River, Park Pl., Gilbert Ave., and Farwell St. 44°48′02″N 91°29′38″W	Eau Claire	Prestigious residential neighborhood. Boundary increase (listed September 10, 2004): Approximately seven blocks in the Third Ward bounded by State St., Summit Ave., Farwell St. and Garfield Ave.
58	Union Auto Company	Union Auto Company	October 11, 2007 (#07001085)	505 S. Barstow St. 44°48′34″N 91°29′51″W	Eau Claire	This 1917 building had an auto showroom at street-level and an elevator to lift cars to the higher floors. The reinforced concrete structure was a rather new technology, strong enough to support cars at all three levels.
59	Union National Bank	Union National Bank	January 28, 1983 (#83003395)	131 S. Barstow St. 44°48′43″N 91°30′00″W	Eau Claire	1930 Art Deco building. Union Bank had roots in local banks that went back to the 1870s.
60	US Post Office and Courthouse	US Post Office and Courthouse	July 25, 1991 (#91000899)	500 S. Barstow Commons; 44°48′32″N 91°29′54″W	Eau Claire	Classical Revival courthouse and post office, built in 1907. Also known as Eau Claire Federal Building.
61	Walter-Heins House	Walter-Heins House	March 19, 1982 (#82000668)	605 N. Barstow St. 44°49′08″N 91°30′08″W	Eau Claire	1897 Queen Anne house, built for John Walter, who brewed Walter's Beer just a few blocks to the north.
62	Water Street Historic District	Water Street Historic District	October 11, 2007 (#07001086)	402-436 & 401-421 Water St. 44°48′07″N 91°30′28″W	Eau Claire	This little business district began as a steamboat landing on the Chippewa River in the 1850s. Today it's a funky little "other downtown" that serves the University community.
63	Dr. Nels Werner House	Dr. Nels Werner House	January 16, 2001 (#00001671)	443 Roosevelt Ave. 44°47′48″N 91°29′27″W	Eau Claire	Georgian Revival home built in 1929 for a local physician.
64	Roy Wilcox House	Roy Wilcox House	January 28, 1983 (#83003396)	104 Wilcox St; 44°48′16″N 91°29′49″W	Eau Claire	Wilcox was an Eau Claire trial lawyer and state senator 1917-20. He built this Prairie School/Georgian Revival home around 1915.
65	George F. Winslow House	George F. Winslow House	December 8, 1978 (#78000094)	210 Oakwood Pl. 44°48′07″N 91°29′45″W	Eau Claire	1889 Queen Anne house designed by architect George Franklin Barber. Winslow published the Woodsman Journal and sold patent medicines to lumbermen in northern Wisconsin.

== Former listing ==
	Name on the Register	Image	Date listed	Date removed	Location	City or town	Description
1	Phoenix Manufacturing Company	Phoenix Manufacturing Company	January 28, 1983 (#83003388)	December 6, 1985	Forest and Wisconsin Sts.	Eau Claire	Company formed in 1861 to build and repair sawmill machinery. Moved to Forest and Wisconsin in 1874 and made bandsaws and the Phoenix steam hauler, a sort of locomotive on bulldozer tracks for pulling loads of logs through the woods. Now redeveloped as Phoenix Park.

== See also ==
- List of National Historic Landmarks in Wisconsin
- National Register of Historic Places listings in Wisconsin
- Listings in neighboring counties: Buffalo, Chippewa, Clark, Dunn, Jackson, Pepin, Trempealeau
