= Drummond House =

Drummond House may refer to:

- David Drummond House, listed on the National Register of Historic Places in Eau Claire County, Wisconsin
- William E. Drummond House, listed on the National Register of Historic Places in Cook County, Illinois
- Drummond Castle, 15th-century castle in Perthshire, Scotland
- Fred and Adeline Drummond House, listed on the National Register of Historic Places in Osage County, Oklahoma
