= St. Joseph's Chapel =

St. Joseph's Chapel or St. Joseph Chapel may refer to:

- St. Joseph Chapel (New York City), United States
- St. Joseph's Chapel (Clinton Corners, New York), United States
- St. Joseph's Chapel (Eau Claire, Wisconsin), listed on the National Register of Historic Places in Eau Claire County, Wisconsin, United States
- St. Joseph's Chapel (Minto, North Dakota), listed on the National Register of Historic Places in Walsh County, North Dakota, United States
- St. Joseph's Chapel (Yim Tin Tsai), Sai Kung District, the New Territories, Hong Kong

== See also ==
- Chapel of St Joseph, Mont Albert North, Victoria, Australia
- Chapel of St. Joseph of Arimathea, New York, United States
- Chapel of St. Joseph (Rhinecliff, New York), United States
