= Bryce House =

Bryce House or Bryce Building may refer to:

- Bryce Building (Fort Worth, Texas), listed on the NRHP in Texas
- William J. Bryce House, Fort Worth, Texas, listed on the NRHP in Texas
- Bryce Inn, Bryce Canyon, Utah, listed on the NRHP in Utah

== See also ==
- Brice House (disambiguation)
- Bryce Building (Fort Worth, Texas), listed on the NRHP in Texas
