= Brice House =

Brice House may refer to:

in the United States (by state)

- Brice House (Annapolis, Maryland), listed on the NRHP in Maryland
- Dr. Walter Brice House and Office, Winnsboro, South Carolina, listed on the NRHP in South Carolina
- Orlando Brice House, Eau Claire, Wisconsin, listed on the NRHP in Wisconsin

== See also ==
- Brice Apartments, Kalispell, MT, listed on the NRHP in Montana
- Bryce House (disambiguation)
