= James Stephen Hoover and Elizabeth Borland Memorial Chapel =

- U.S. National Register of Historic Places
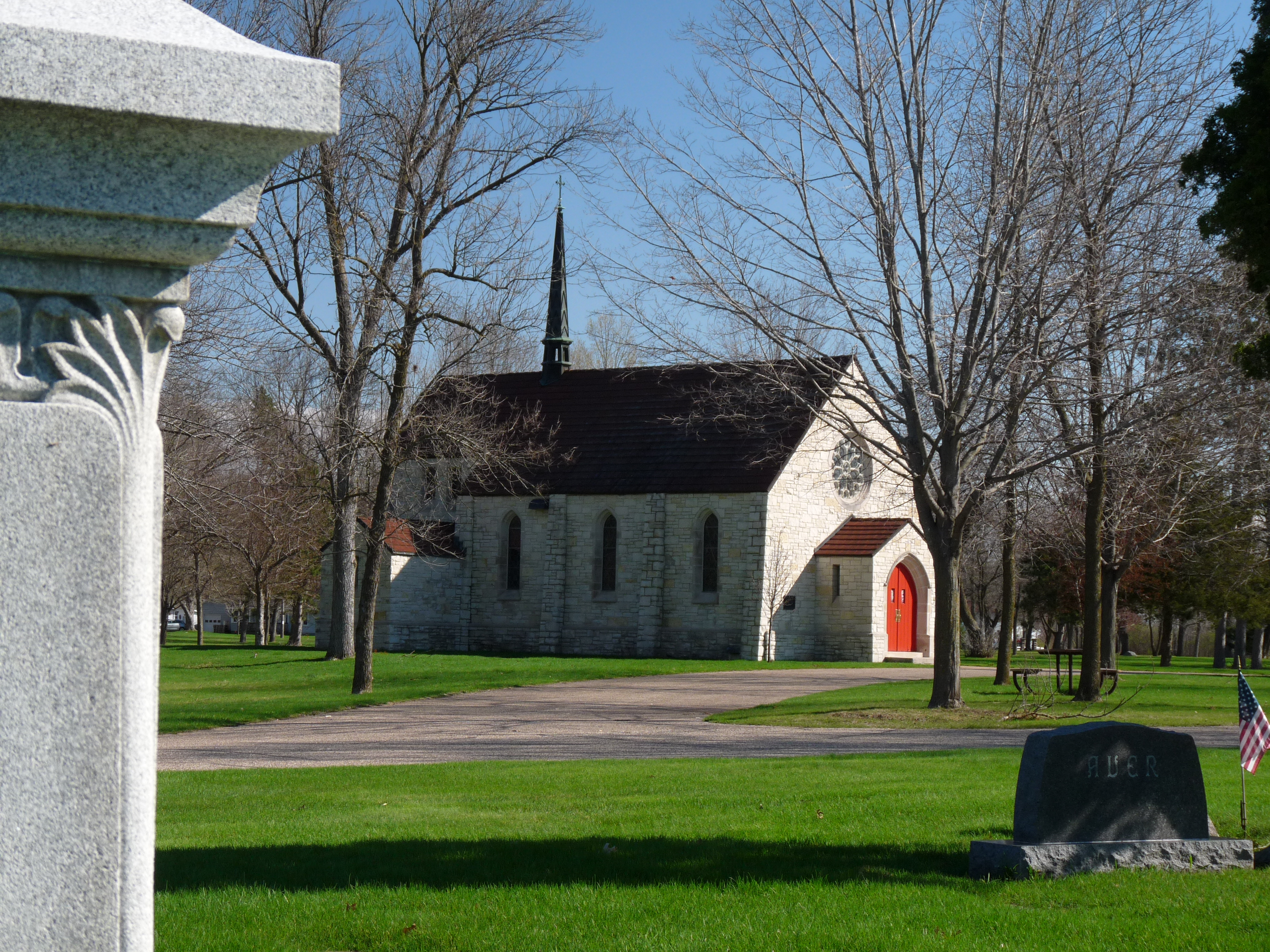
- Location: Buffington Dr. Eau Claire, Wisconsin
- Coordinates: 44.81214°N 91.52466°W
- Built: 1936
- Architect: John Tilton
- Architectural style: Gothic Revival
- NRHP reference No.: 99001662
- Added to NRHP: January 7, 2000

The James Stephen Hoover and Elizabeth Borland Memorial Chapel is located in Eau Claire, Wisconsin. It was added to the National Register of Historic Places in 2000 for its architectural significance.

The Hoover-Borland Chapel is a funeral chapel in Lakeview Cemetery, on the bluff above Half Moon Lake. It is in Neo-Gothic Revival style, clad in random ashlar stone, and trimmed in Bedford limestone. The front entrance is a pointed arch door, with a rose window above. Each side has four stone buttresses and pointed-arch windows. The roof is covered in ceramic tiles, and a small metal spirelet topped with a Latin cross rises from the ridge.

Inside are simple wooden pews, and a poured concrete altar with a silver cross. The walls are plastered. The roof is supported by King-post wood trusses, exposed rafters and purlins. Christian symbols are painted on the trusses.

Lakeview Cemetery was established in 1867 by West Eau Claire. It was Eau Claire's second official cemetery, after Forest Hill, which was established in 1862, though people had been buried on the bluff that would become Lakeview as early as 1858. After Lakeview was established, Byron Buffington a local businessman and civic leader, donated 15 acres to the cemetery in honor of his parents George and Pluma Buffington. George had also been a businessman, running the Niagara House hotel, co-owning the Valley Lumber Company, serving as mayor of Eau Claire, and founding the Eau Claire Street Railroad Company.

Frances "Fannie" Hoover married Byron Buffington in 1874. Her father James was a butcher in Eau Claire from 1866 to 1898. Elizabeth Borland was her mother. Around 1936 Fannie donated the Hoover-Borland chapel to the cemetery in honor of her parents.

The chapel was designed by John Tilton of Chicago in a rather simplified Gothic Revival style and built in 1936. The chapel was built by the Hoeppner-Bartlett Company, a notable regional building contractor based in Eau Claire, for $25,000. The chapel served two initial aims: the basement contains 42 receiving vaults where bodies can be stored during the winter, until the ground thaws for digging. The upper part of the chapel is used for burial services.

== See also ==
- Jane E. Putnam Memorial Chapel: Eau Claire
- Our Lady of Sorrows Chapel: La Crosse
- National Register of Historic Places listings in Eau Claire County, Wisconsin
