= Henry Laycock =

American politician

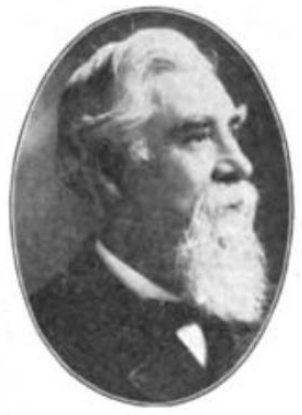

Member of the Wisconsin State Assembly
- Constituency: Eau Claire County First District
- In office 1908–1910
- In office 1912–1914

Personal details
- Born: March 14, 1842 Yorkshire, England
- Died: May 2, 1929 (aged 87) Eau Claire, Wisconsin
- Party: Republican
- Spouse: Margaret E. Brewer (m. 1872; died 1912)
- Children: 2
- Occupation: Contractor, politician

Henry Laycock (March 14, 1842 – May 2, 1929) was a member of the Wisconsin State Assembly.

== Biography ==
Laycock was born on March 14, 1842, in Yorkshire, England. During the American Civil War, he served with the 8th Regiment Illinois Volunteer Cavalry of the Union Army. In 1872, Laycock married Margaret E. Brewer (1842–1912). They had two children. He died in Eau Claire on May 2, 1929.

Laycock helped build what is now known as the Barnes Block, listed on the National Register of Historic Places.

== Political career ==
Laycock was elected to the Assembly in 1908 and 1912. Other positions he held include alderman of Eau Claire, Wisconsin. He was a Republican.
