= Eau Claire Masonic Temple =

- U.S. National Register of Historic Places
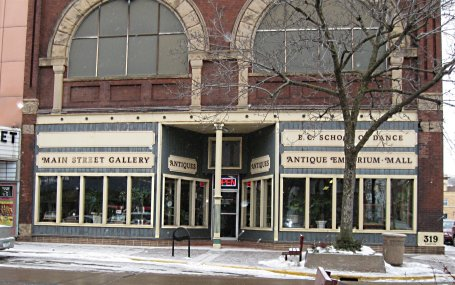

- Location within Wisconsin
- Location: 317-319 South Barstow & 306 Main Streets; Eau Claire, Wisconsin
- Coordinates: 44.810278°N 91.498333°W
- Area: less than one acre
- Built: 1899
- Architectural style: Romanesque Revival
- NRHP reference No.: 07001197
- Added to NRHP: November 14, 2007

The Eau Claire Masonic Temple at the corner of South Barstow and Main Streets in Eau Claire, Wisconsin was built in 1899 and listed on the National Register of Historic Places in 2007.

In 1927 the Masonic bodies that met there relocated to their recently completed Temple of Free Masonry on Graham Avenue.

It is a three-story brick building. "The clearly visible pair of massive stone arches on the Barstow Street façade and other decorative elements distinguish the Masonic Temple as a fine example of H.H. Richardson-influenced Romanesque Revival architecture and one of the most architecturally significant buildings in the downtown area."
