= Our Lady of Sorrows Chapel =

Historic church in Wisconsin, United States

- U.S. National Register of Historic Places
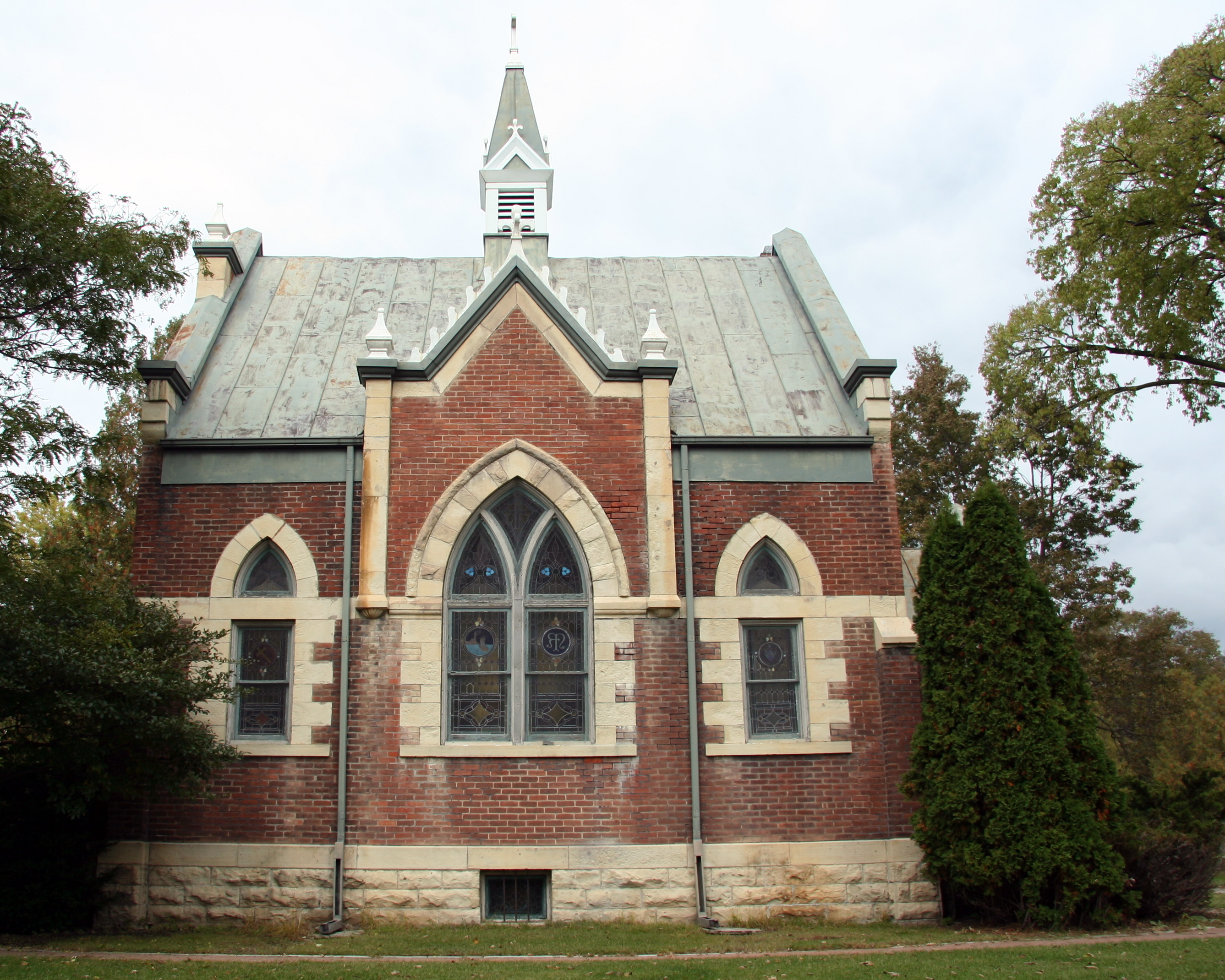
- Our Lady of Sorrows Chapel
- Location: 519 Losey Boulevard South; La Crosse, Wisconsin
- Coordinates: 43.80431°N 91.21844°W
- Built: 1891
- Architectural style: Gothic Revival
- NRHP reference No.: 86002302
- Added to NRHP: September 11, 1986

Our Lady of Sorrows Chapel, also called the Chapel of the Blessed Virgin of the Seven Dolors, is a cemetery chapel in La Crosse, Wisconsin, United States. It was added to the National Register of Historic Places in 1986. Additionally, it is a designated Historic Site by the City of La Crosse.

== See also ==
- Jane E. Putnam Memorial Chapel: Eau Claire
- James Stephen Hoover and Elizabeth Borland Memorial Chapel: Eau Claire
- National Register of Historic Places listings in La Crosse County, Wisconsin
