= Jane E. Putnam Memorial Chapel =

- U.S. National Register of Historic Places
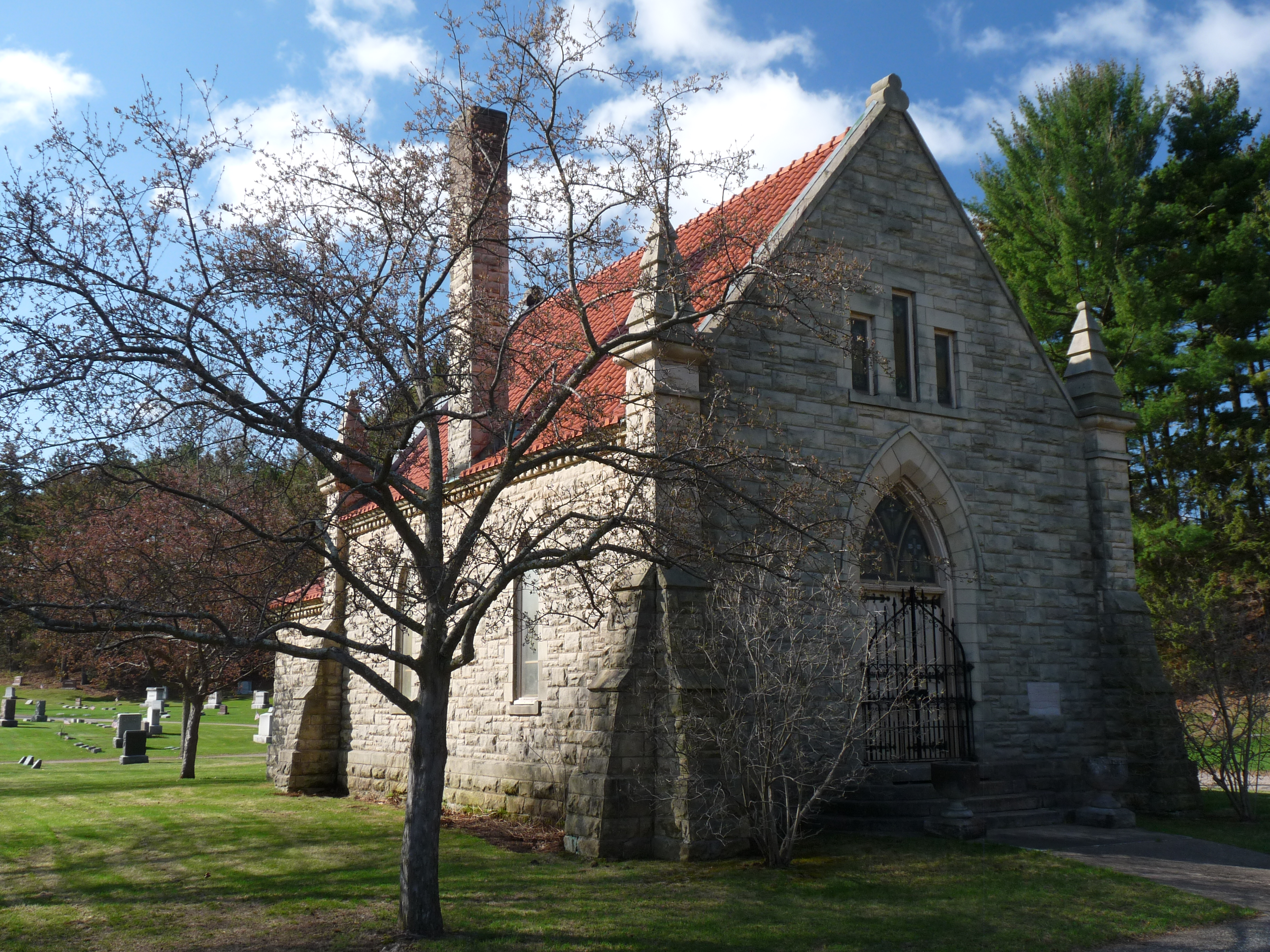
- Location: Emery St. Eau Claire, Wisconsin
- Coordinates: 44.80827°N 91.48832°W
- Built: 1908
- Architectural style: Gothic Revival
- NRHP reference No.: 99001663
- Added to NRHP: January 7, 2000

The Jane E. Putnam Memorial Chapel is a Neogothic-styled funeral chapel built in 1908 in Eau Claire, Wisconsin. It was added to the National Register of Historic Places for its architectural significance in 2000.

== Background of dedication ==
Jane E. Balcolm was born in Oxford, New York in 1832 and came to Eau Claire in 1857. In 1858 she married Henry C. Putnam, who had come to Wisconsin (also from New York) in 1855 as a government land surveyor. He worked as a "timber cruiser," assessing tracts of pine land in the Chippewa Valley for himself and for other investors like Cornell University. He was one of the most successful land agents in the area and became a clerk in Eau Claire's federal land office. He sat on the board of directors of several lumber companies and helped found the Chippewa Valley Bank and the Eau Claire Linen Company.

The couple was generous in the community. They helped finance construction of First Presbyterian Church in 1857, and Jane organized Eau Claire's first public library in 1875. Before Jane died in 1907, she asked that a chapel be built for the people of Eau Claire, to be used for services and to hold the bodies of those who died in winter until the ground thawed. The year after Jane died, Henry obtained a half acre in Forest Hill Cemetery and had the chapel constructed.

== Architecture and design ==
The chapel is a steep-roofed one-story Neogothic-styled building, with walls of random rough-faced stone. Doors and windows are tall and lancet-pointed. A pair of wood doors behind wrought-iron gates guards the front entrance. Corners are buttressed, with a pinnacle on each corner. The roof is covered with red barrel tile, with shallow parapets rising above the gable ends. At the back is an apse-like rectangular extension with a flared hip roof.

Inside, an aisle runs down the center. On the east wall of the main nave is a simple fireplace. Above are wood trusses with hammer-posts, braces and struts. Burial crypts are on each side of the central aisle beneath concrete panels in the floor. Seven Putnams lie in the crypts on the west side, including Jane and Henry.

== Use ==
The apse section in back has 24 receiving vaults for temporary storage of bodies during winter, but these are no longer used. Services are no longer held in the chapel either. It is now used primarily for storage.

== See also ==
- James Stephen Hoover and Elizabeth Borland Memorial Chapel: Eau Claire
- Our Lady of Sorrows Chapel: La Crosse
- National Register of Historic Places listings in Eau Claire County, Wisconsin
