= Soo Line Railroad Bridge =

- U.S. National Register of Historic Places
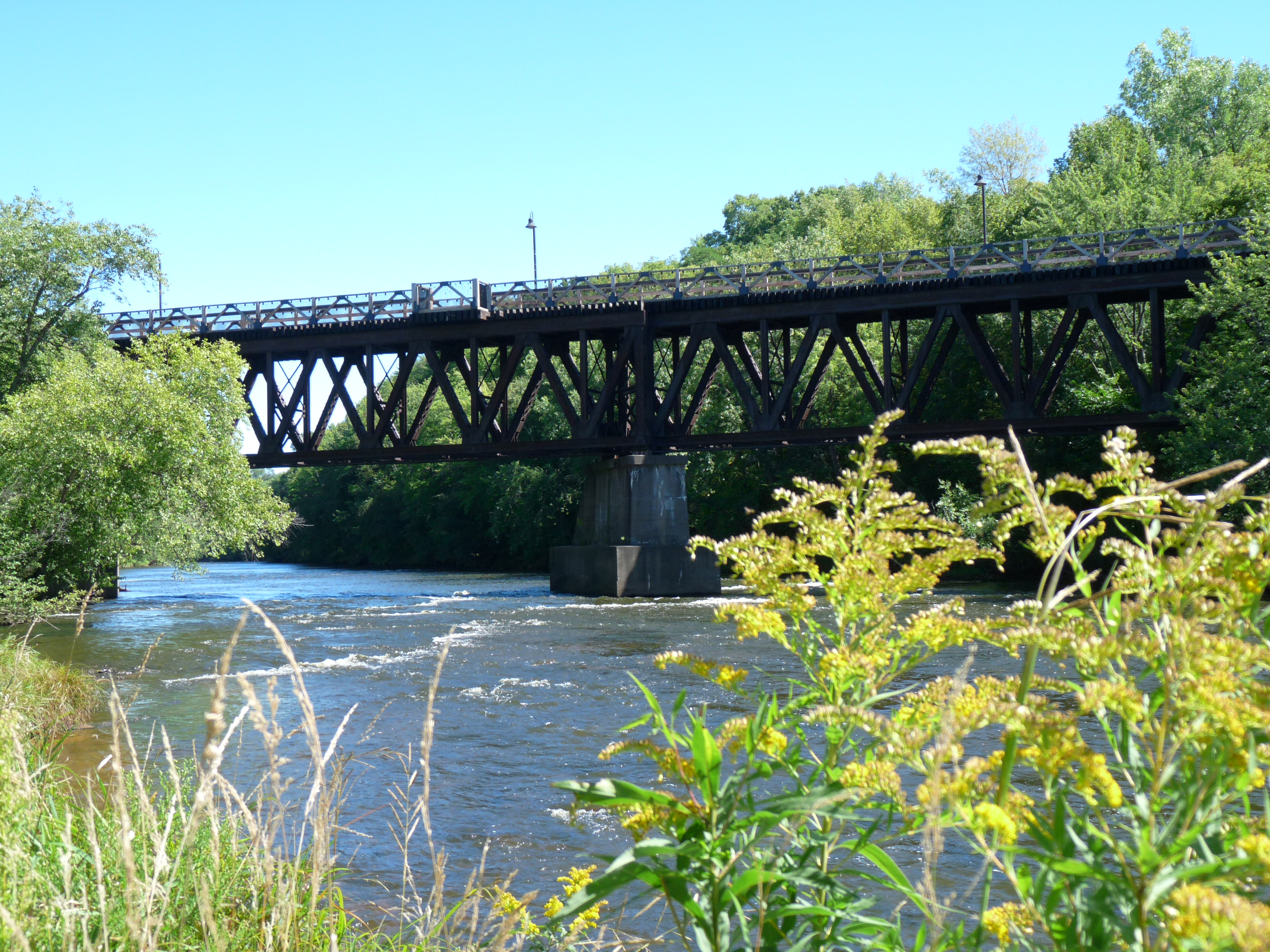
- The Soo Line Railroad Bridge across the Eau Claire River

- Location within Wisconsin Location within the United States
- Nearest city: Eau Claire, Wisconsin
- Coordinates: 44°49′04″N 91°27′58″W
- Built: 1910
- Built by: Minneapolis Steel and Machinery Co.
- NRHP reference No.: 100007982
- Added to NRHP: August 12, 2022

The Soo Line Railroad Bridge, known locally as the S-Bridge, is a steel Warren deck truss bridge over the Eau Claire River in Eau Claire, Wisconsin, United States. It was built by the Minneapolis Steel and Machinery Company in 1910 for the Soo Line Railroad to replace an 1890 wooden bridge. The bridge bends in an S shape over its 442 foot length in order to allow trains to cross the Eau Claire River on gentle curves between the parallel tracks located on either side of the river. The bridge was abandoned in 1991 and turned into a trail in 2002. The bridge was listed on the National Register of Historic Places on August 12, 2022.

== See also ==
- List of bridges on the National Register of Historic Places in Wisconsin
- National Register of Historic Places listings in Eau Claire County, Wisconsin
