= Bryce Building =

- U.S. National Register of Historic Places
- Recorded Texas Historic Landmark
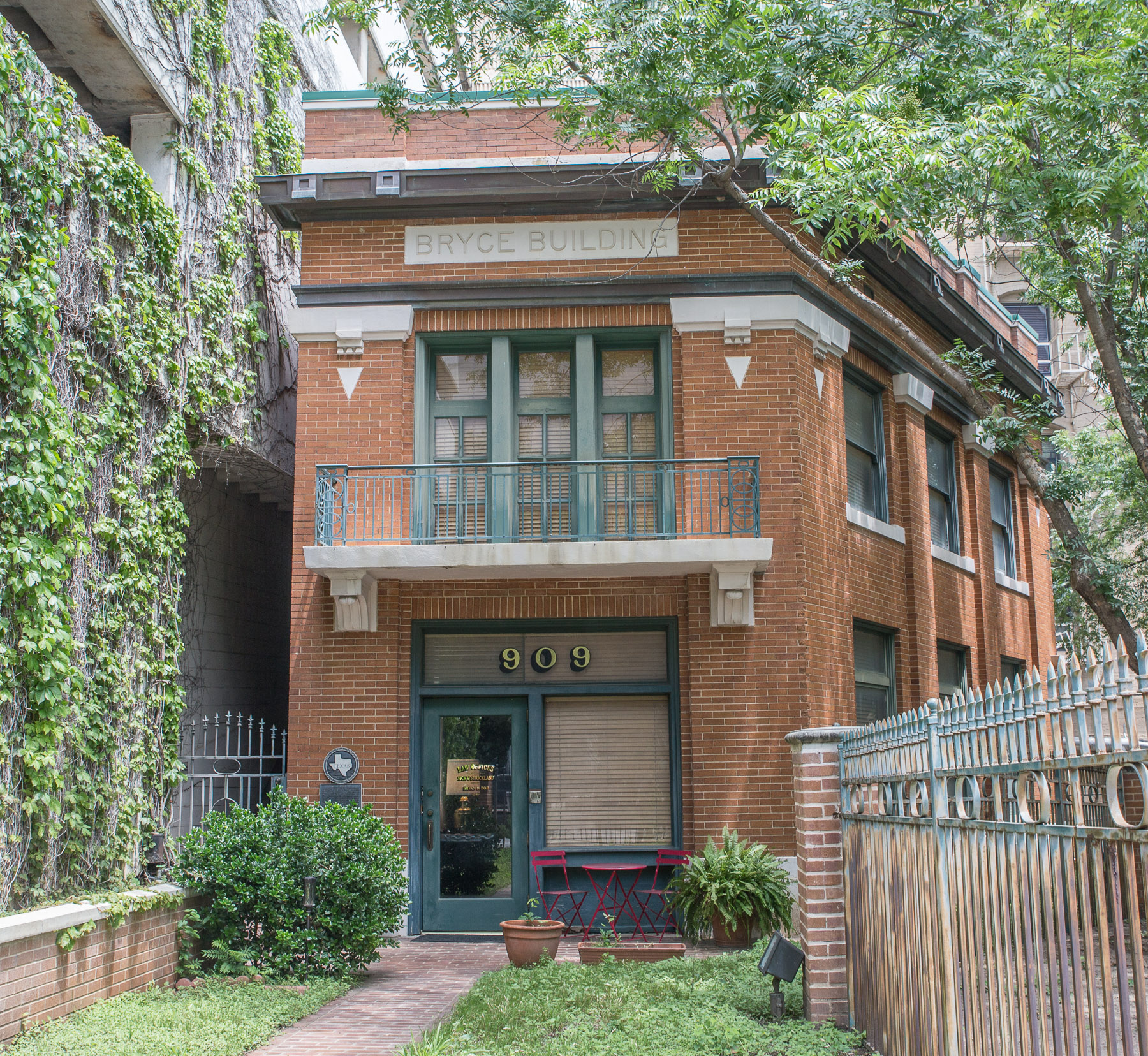
- Bryce Building in 2021

- Location within Texas Location within the United States
- Location: 909 Throckmorton St., Fort Worth, Texas
- Coordinates: 32°45′04″N 97°19′49″W
- Area: less than one acre
- Built: 1910
- Architect: William J. Bryce
- Architectural style: Renaissance
- NRHP reference No.: 84001963
- RTHL No.: 550

Significant dates
- Added to NRHP: February 23, 1984
- Designated RTHL: 1983

Bryce Building is located on 909 Throckmorton Street in Fort Worth, Texas. The two-story office building was named after businessman and former mayor William Bryce. The building was designed in the Classical Revival style. It was constructed with brick made by Denton Press Brick Company. In 1982 a fire caused major damage to the building. The building currently houses a law firm.

It was added to the National Register on February 23, 1984.

== Photo gallery ==
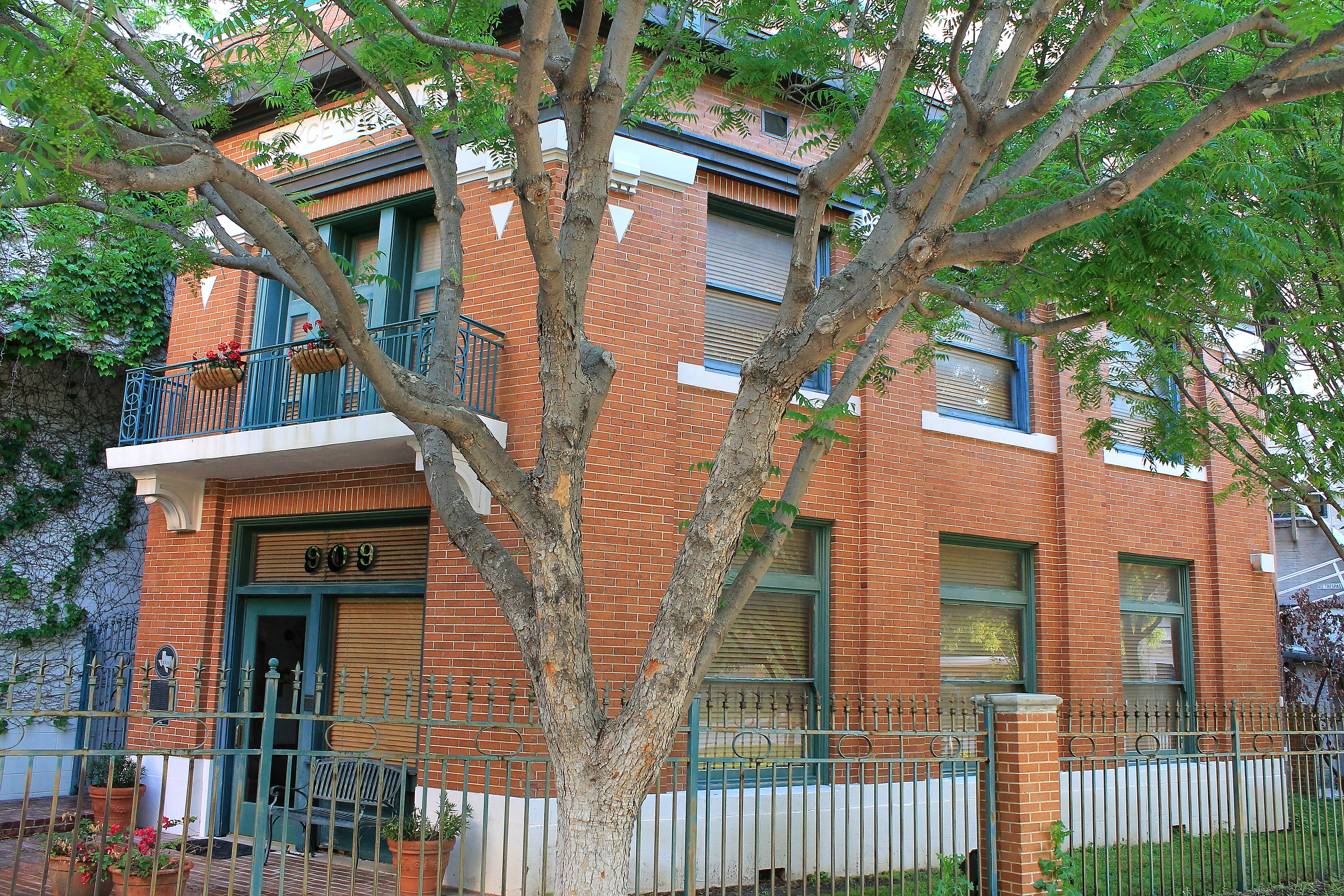

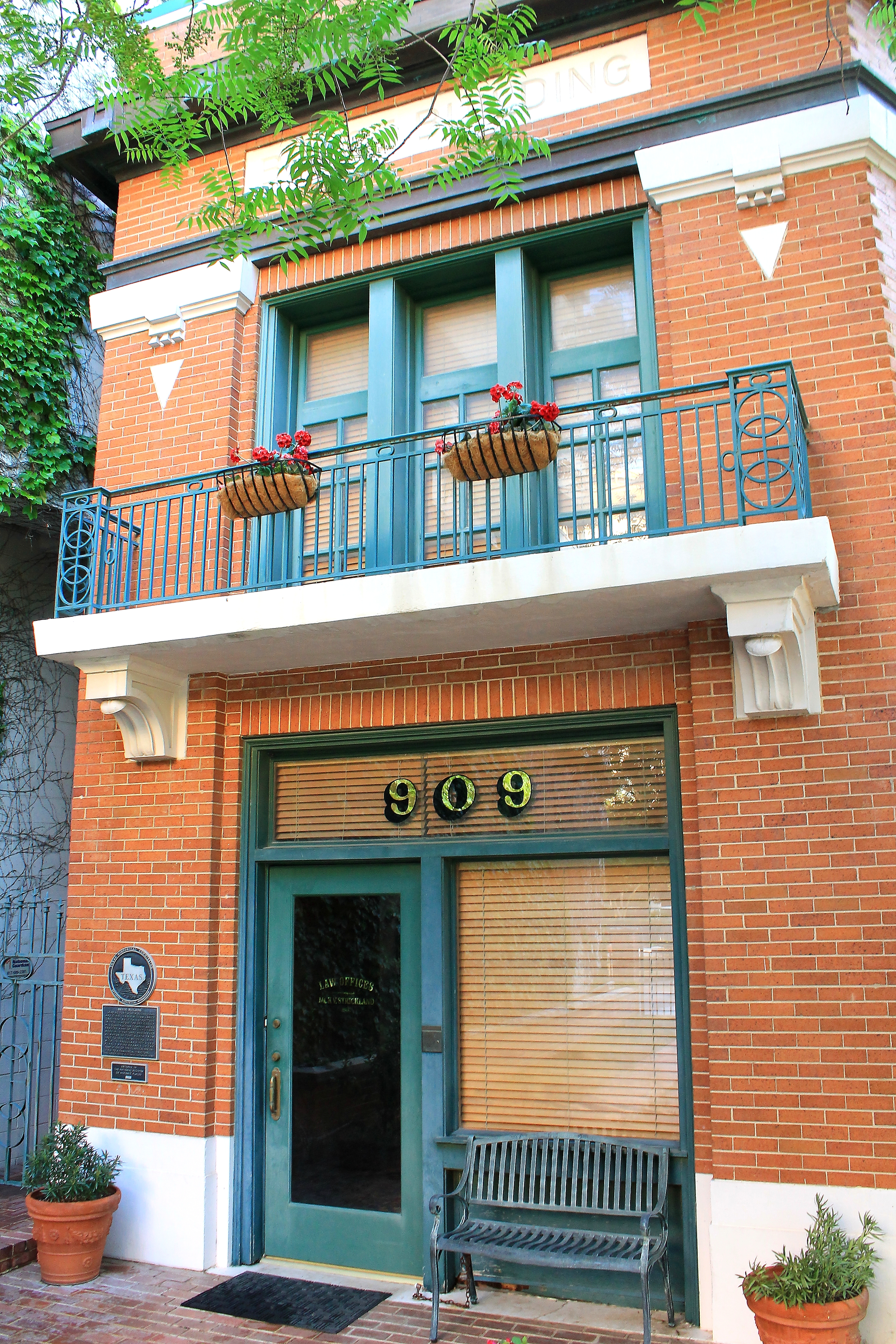

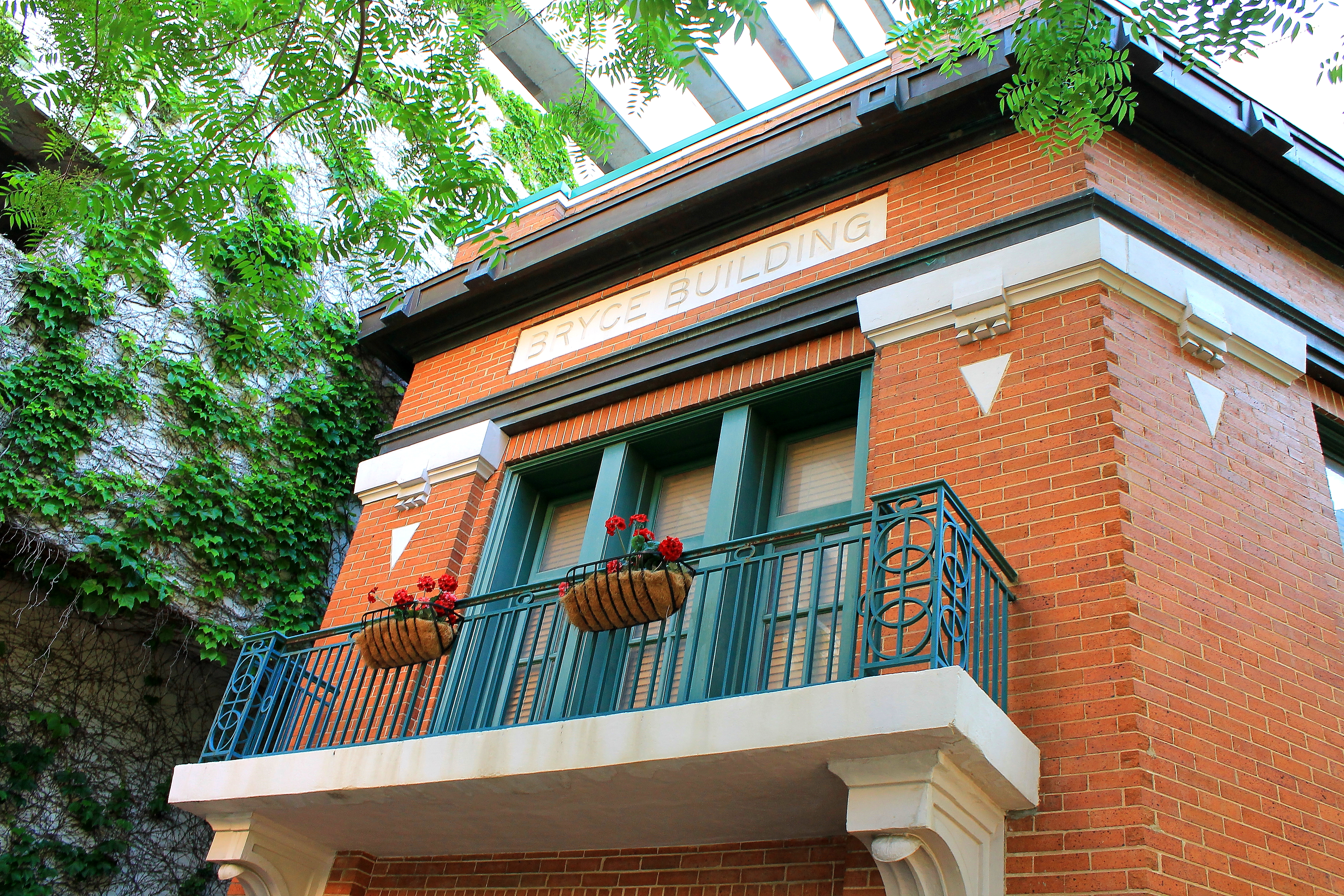

== See also ==
- National Register of Historic Places listings in Tarrant County, Texas
- Recorded Texas Historic Landmarks in Tarrant County
