= William E. Drummond House =

Historic house in Illinois, United States

- U.S. National Register of Historic Places
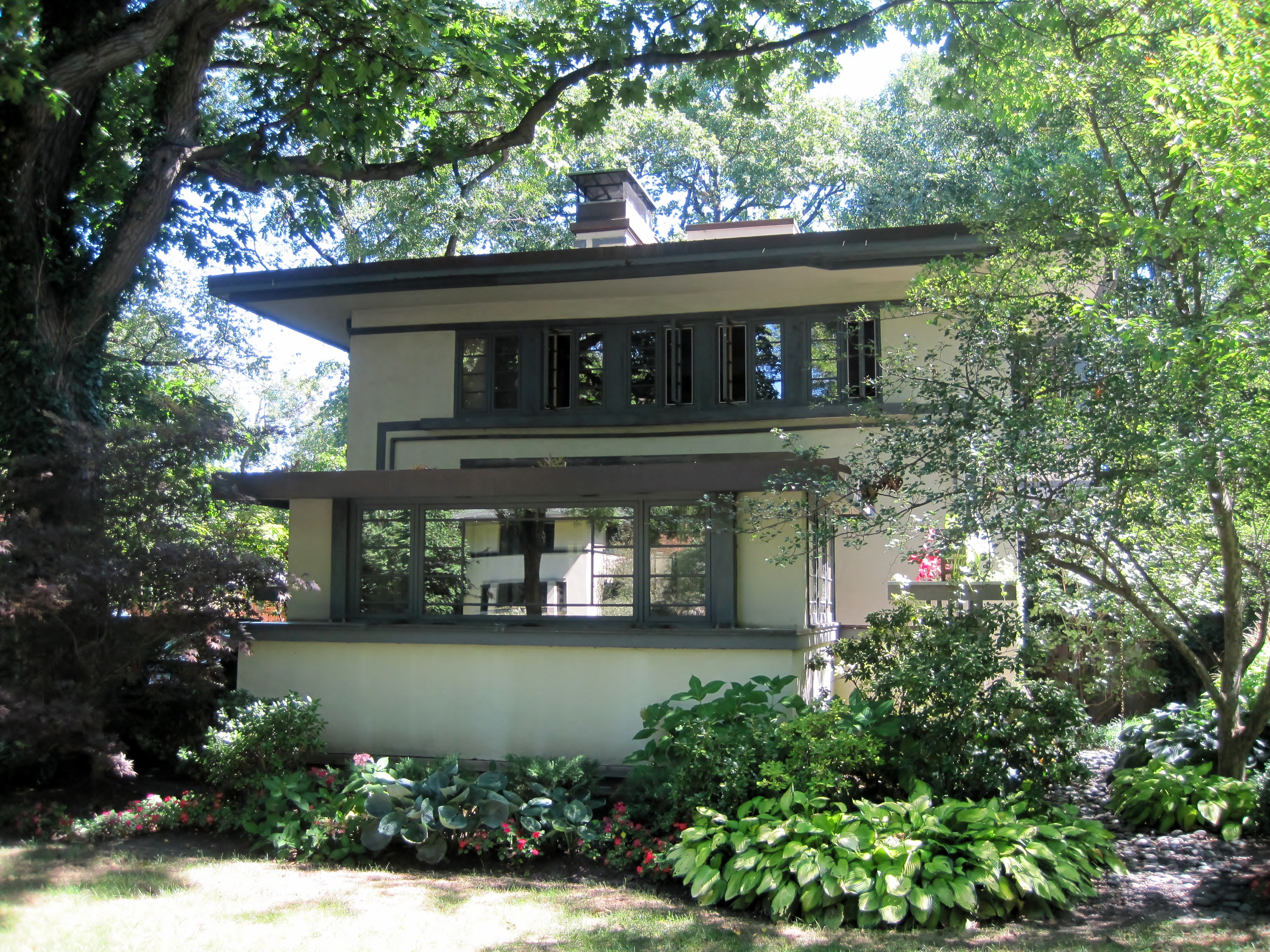

- Location within Illinois Location within the United States
- Location: 559 Edgewood Pl., River Forest, Illinois
- Coordinates: 41°53′23″N 87°49′38″W
- Area: 0.2 acres (0.081 ha)
- Built: 1909
- Architect: Drummond, William E.
- Architectural style: Prairie School
- NRHP reference No.: 70000241
- Added to NRHP: March 5, 1970

The William E. Drummond House is a Prairie School house located at 559 Edgewood Place in River Forest, Illinois. The house was designed by William Eugene Drummond in 1909 using a basic design published by Frank Lloyd Wright in 1907. While the house reflects Wright's principles of design, the details and construction are considered to be superior to Wright's buildings of the era. The house has been called "one of the best examples" of a Prairie School house not designed by Wright and "an excellent example of the 'economy Prairie House'".

The house was added to the National Register of Historic Places on March 5, 1970.
