= Roosevelt Avenue Historic District =

Historic district in Wisconsin, United States

- U.S. National Register of Historic Places
- U.S. Historic district
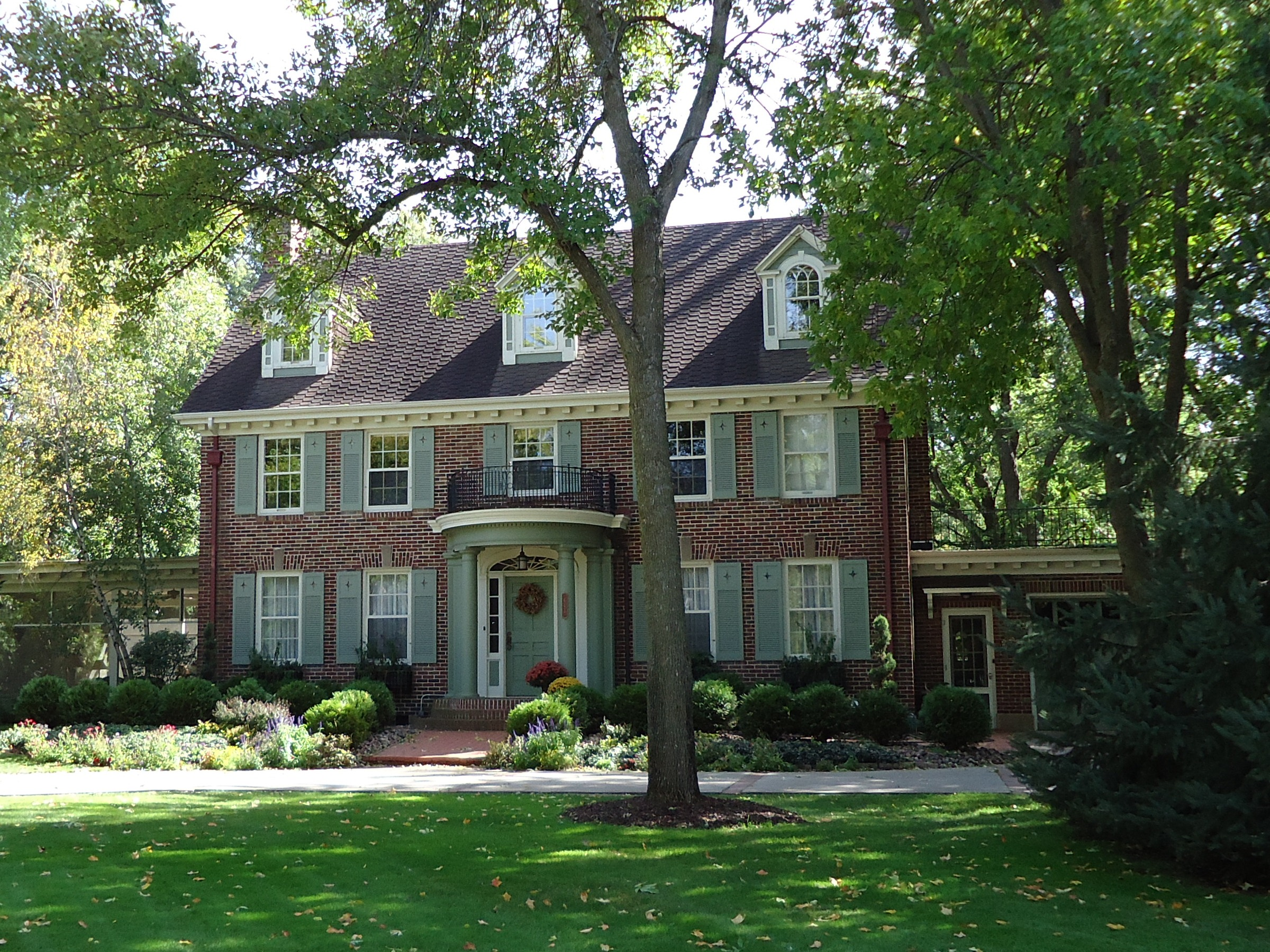
- 443 Roosevelt Ave.

- Location within Wisconsin Location within the United States
- Location: Eau Claire, Wisconsin
- Coordinates: 44.79629°N 91.49165°W
- NRHP reference No.: 09000219
- Added to NRHP: April 15, 2009

The Roosevelt Avenue Historic District is located in Eau Claire, Wisconsin, United States. It was added to the National Register of Historic Places in 2009. Contributing buildings in the district were constructed from 1929 to 1941.
