= Owen Park (Eau Claire, Wisconsin) =

Park in Eau Claire, Wisconsin, United States

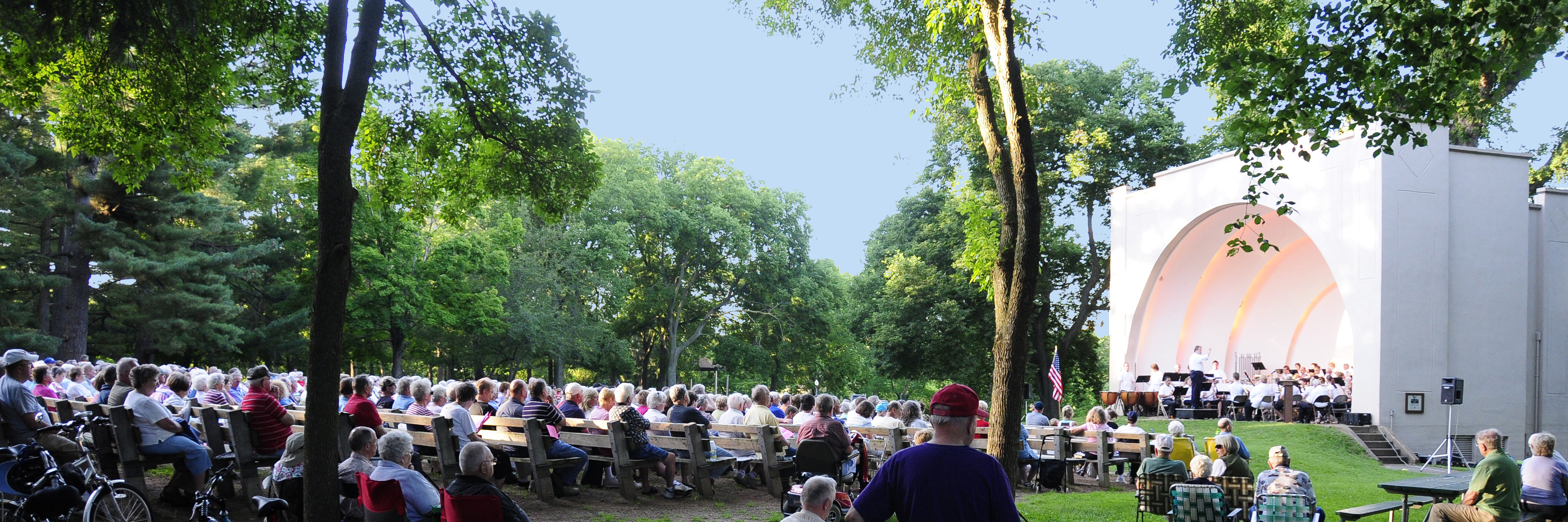

- Location within Wisconsin
- Location: 1st Avenue, Eau Claire, Wisconsin
- Coordinates: 44°48′18″N 91°29′58″W
- Area: 11-acre (4.5 ha)
- Public transit: ECT: 7

Owen Park is an 11-acre (4.5 ha) parcel of land that stretches along the west bank of the Chippewa River from Lake Street to Water Street. Adjacent to the University of Wisconsin–Eau Claire on one end, it is only a block away from downtown Eau Claire, Wisconsin, on the other.

== History ==
The land was donated in 1913 by lumber baron John S. Owen in an effort to make Eau Claire a "city of parks." However, it was not developed and made available to the public until sometime in the 1920s. In addition to the outdoor music events which began in 1932, the park is becoming known in the 21st century for its car shows as well as its pie and ice cream socials hosted by various nonprofit organizations.

== Amenities ==
The park offers a bike trail, playground equipment, lit tennis courts, a gazebo, picnic tables, and rest rooms. The centerpiece of Owen Park is the Sarge Boyd Bandshell, a structure listed on the National Register of Historic Places that was built to showcase the musical pride of the city, the Eau Claire Municipal Band. Seating for approximately 1450 people is provided. These amenities, along with a no-alcohol policy, make Owen Park a favorite gathering spot for people of all ages, especially during the summer months when the Municipal Band and other local groups present their annual concert series.
