= Oatman Filling Station =

- U.S. National Register of Historic Places
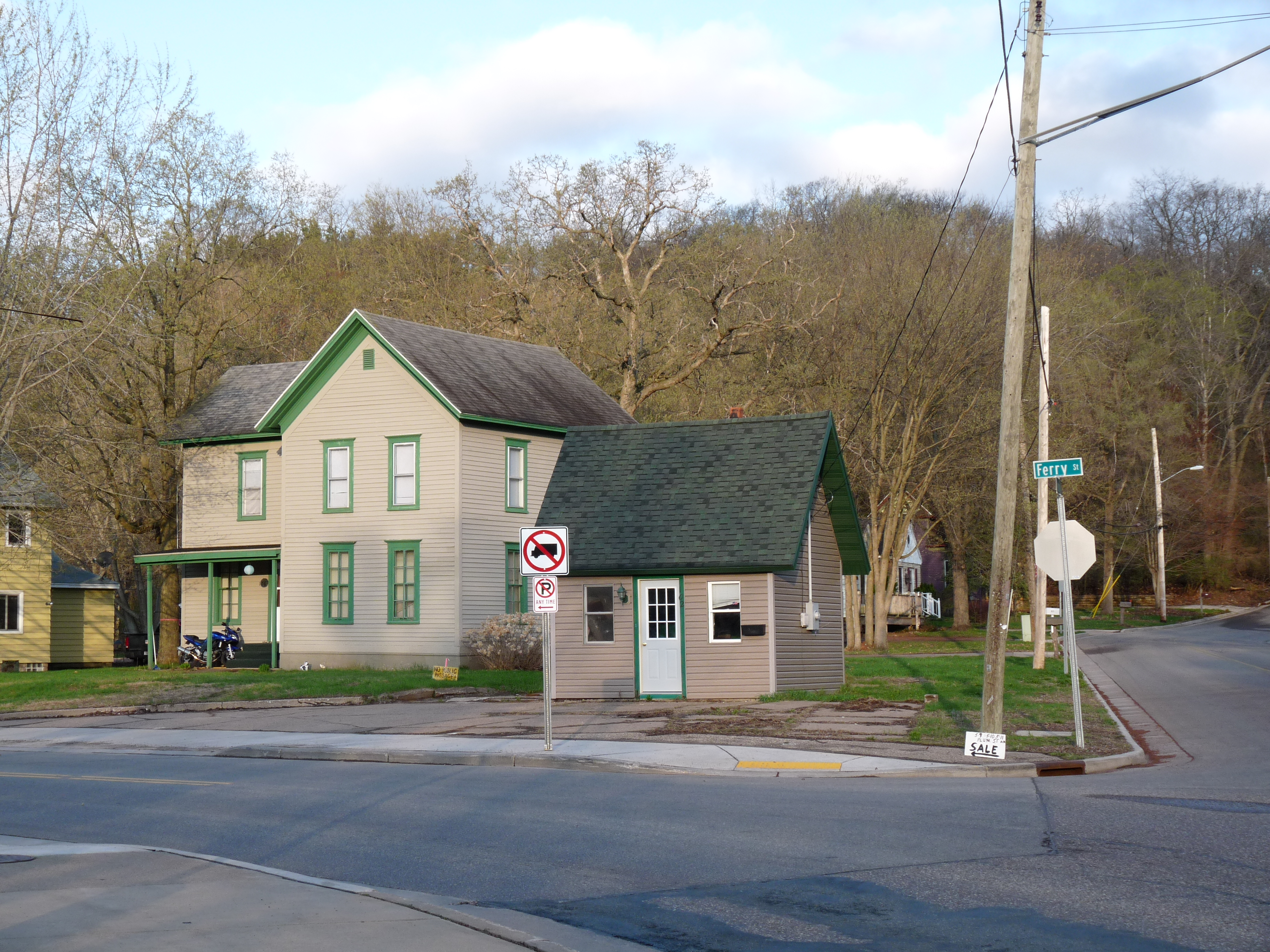
- Location: 102 Ferry St. Eau Claire, Wisconsin
- Coordinates: 44.79893°N 91.5349°W
- Built: 1931
- Architectural style: Tudor Revival
- NRHP reference No.: 00001669
- Added to NRHP: January 16, 2001

The Oatman Filling Station is located in Eau Claire, Wisconsin. It was added to the National Register of Historic Places in 2001.

== History ==
The filling station was built by Frank Oatman in 1931. The station is the sole intact gas station in Eau Claire from before 1940. Many gas stations built between 1920 and 1935 were designed to look like houses, because oil companies were starting to build gas stations in neighborhoods and residents were objecting to utilitarian structures that looked like lumber or coal yard buildings. The Oatman Filling Station building incorporated Tudor Revival cottage styling and included office and restroom space. It was affiliated with Texaco for most of its existence, but from the late 1980s until it closed in September 1996, it was a Sinclair Oil affiliate.
