= Barnes Block =

- U.S. National Register of Historic Places
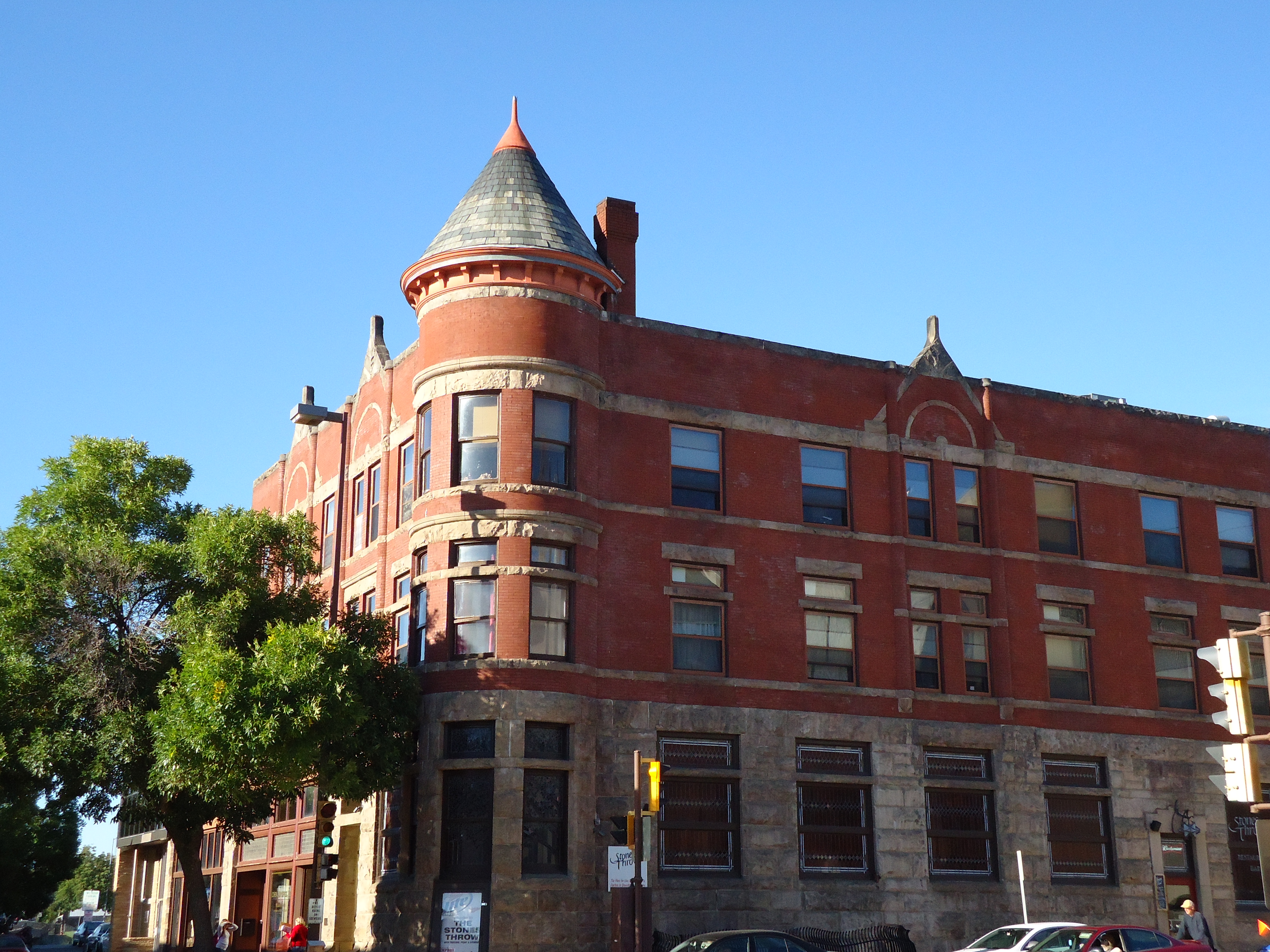
- Barnes Block

- Location within Wisconsin Location within the United States
- Location: 15-21 S. Barstow St., Eau Claire, Wisconsin
- Coordinates: 44°48′46″N 91°30′04″W
- Area: 0.4 acres (0.16 ha)
- Built: 1893
- Architect: Henry Laycock
- Architectural style: Richardsonian Romanesque
- NRHP reference No.: 82000665
- Added to NRHP: January 22, 1982

The Barnes Block is located in Eau Claire, Wisconsin.

== History ==
For several years, the Chippewa Valley Bank was housed in the building. It also has connections with a number of local politicians, including Byron Buffington, who was the bank president, and Henry Laycock, who helped build it. Both men were members of the Wisconsin State Assembly.

The building was listed on the National Register of Historic Places in 1982 and on the State Register of Historic Places in 1989.
