= Byron Buffington =

American businessman and politician

Member of the Wisconsin State Assembly
- In office 1896–1900

Personal details
- Born: November 27, 1852 Juneau, Wisconsin
- Died: October 1, 1929 (aged 76) Eau Claire, Wisconsin
- Party: Republican

Byron A. Buffington (November 27, 1852 – October 1, 1929) was an American businessman and politician.

== Biography ==
Born in Juneau, Wisconsin, Buffington was educated in the public schools in Eau Claire, Wisconsin and Faribault Military School in Faribault, Minnesota. Buffington was in the grocery, merchandise, and lumber businesses. He was also president of the Chippewa Valley Bank. Buffington served in the Wisconsin State Assembly in 1897 and 1899 as a Republican.

Buffington died in Eau Claire, Wisconsin from complications caused by appendicitis.
