= Waldemar Ager =

Norwegian-American newspaperman and author

- Born: Waldemar Theodor Ager; March 23, 1869; Fredrikstad, Østfold, Norway
- Died: August 1, 1941 (aged 72)

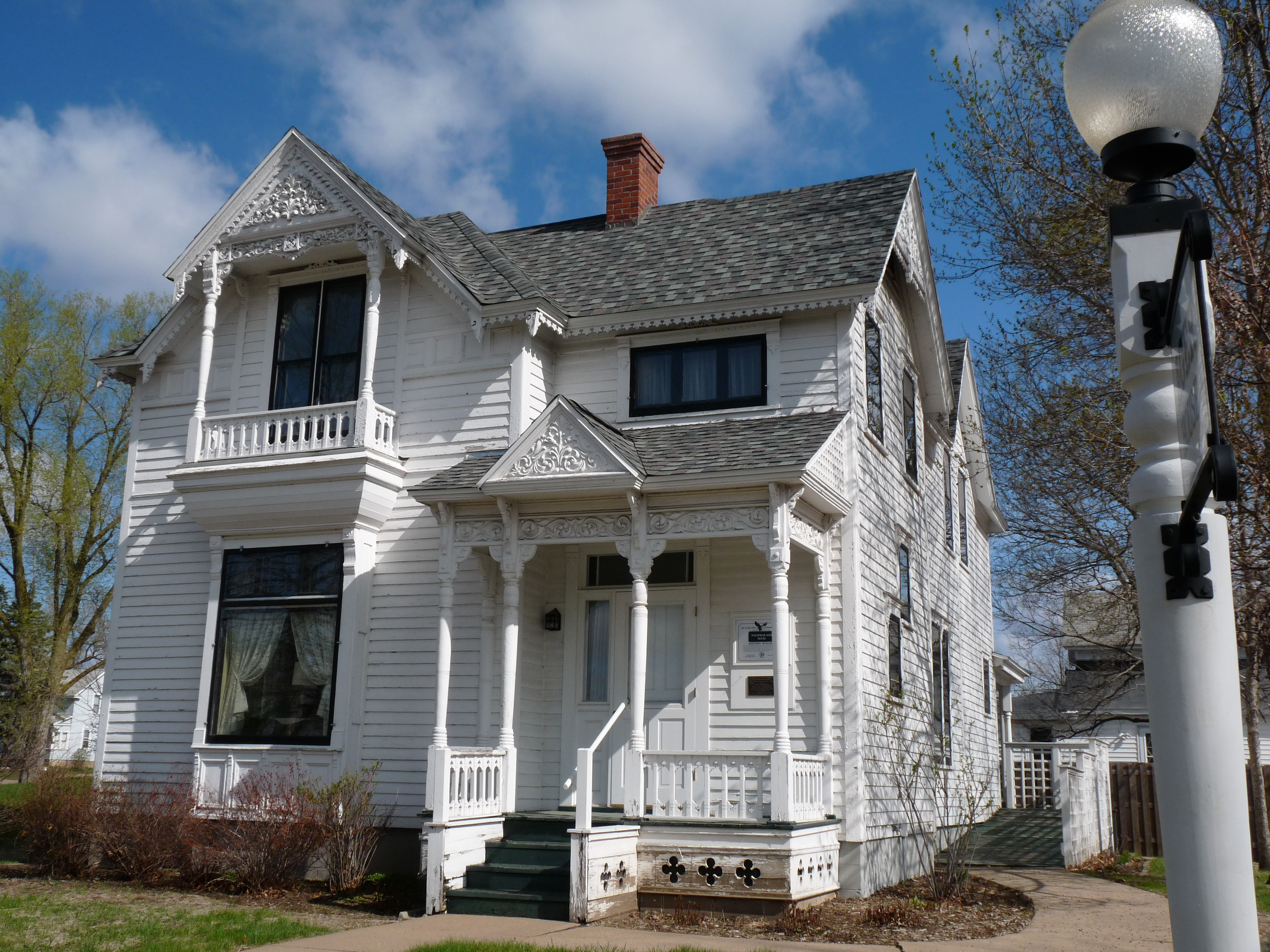
Waldemar Ager house, Eau Claire, Wisconsin

Waldemar Theodor Ager (March 23, 1869 – August 1, 1941) was a Norwegian-American newspaperman and author.

== Early life ==
Waldemar Theodor Ager was born at Fredrikstad, in Østfold, Norway. He grew up nearby in Gressvik, just across the Glomma River. He was the son of Martinius Mathisen Ager (1834–1894) and Marie Fredrikke Mathea Johnsdatter Stillaugsen (1835–1913). Today, the street he lived on in Gressvik is named Waldemar Agers Vei in honor and in memory of Ager. In 1883, Ager's father emigrated to America by himself to start a tailoring shop. In 1885, Waldemar Ager and his family went to join his father in Chicago.

Not long after his arrival in America, Ager and got his start in the newspaper business by becoming involved with Norden, Chicago's largest-circulation Norwegian-language newspaper. He never held any high position at that newspaper, but it got him his start in the business. When Ager first arrived in America, he encountered a vibrant, thriving Norwegian-American community. Use of the Norwegian language was widespread. Hundreds of small-circulation Norwegian-language newspapers and dozens of large circulation Norwegian-language newspapers were in operation from Michigan to the Dakotas and everywhere Norwegian immigrants were living. At the time, the Norwegian-American community was constantly being reinforced by new immigrants from Norway.

Norwegian-American cultural and linguistic retention were at their height from the 1890s-1910s. Over a million Americans spoke Norwegian as their primary language in those three decades. It is estimated that over 3,000 Lutheran churches in the Upper Midwest used Norwegian as their sole language of worship. It is to the retention of this Norwegian-American culture that Waldemar Ager dedicated much of the rest of his life. He also championed many liberal political causes including women's suffrage, various farmer and labor movements, and prohibition.

== Prohibitionist ==
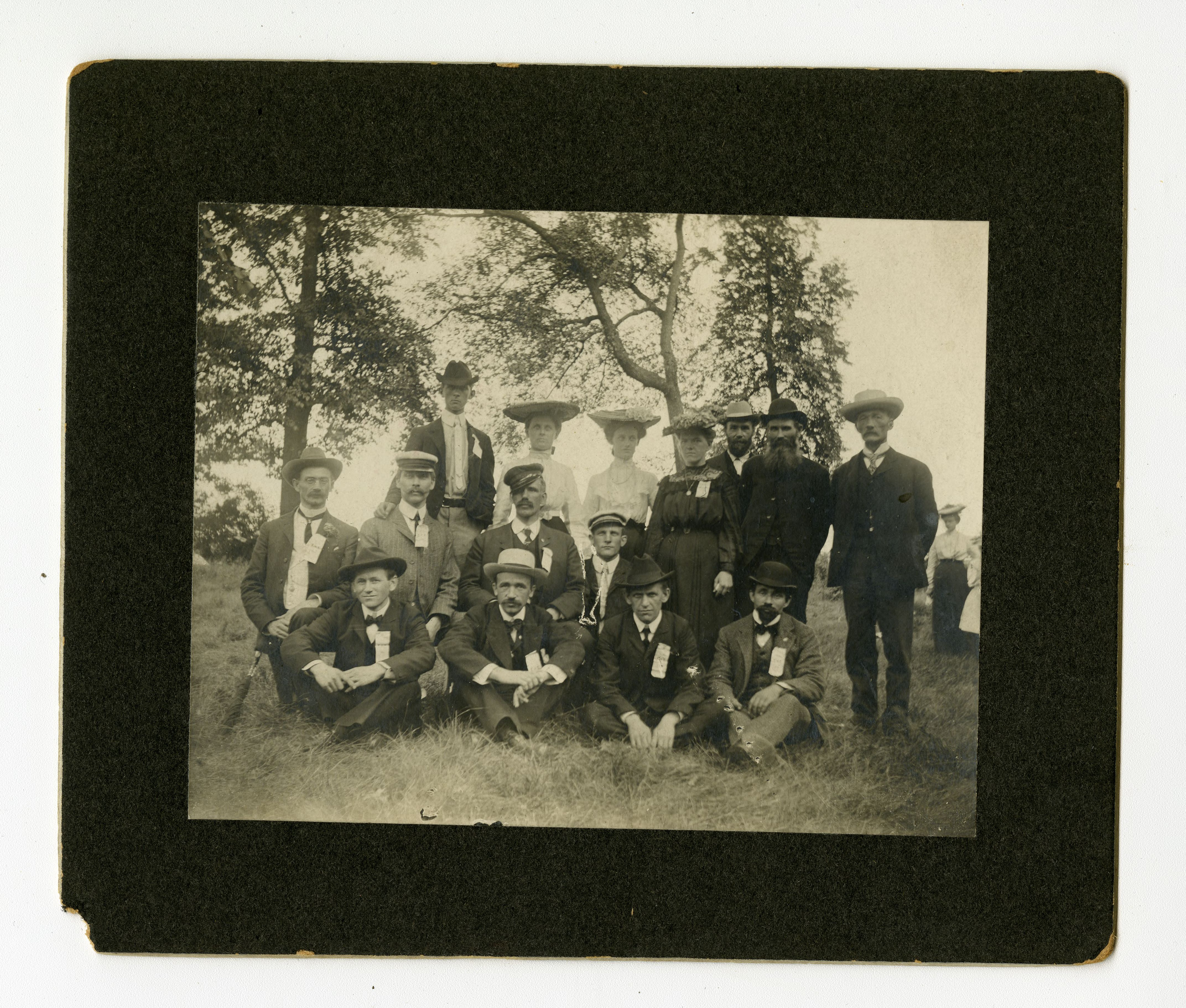
Group portrait of members of the Norwegian American temperance movement, Minnesota. Ager is pictured in the bottom row, second from the left.

Prohibition was very popular in the Norwegian-American community and Ager became one of the leaders of the movement. Ager personally helped form hundreds of total abstinence societies and Good Templar lodges across the Upper Midwest. Ager's prohibitionist beliefs and his fledgling newspaper career crossed paths for the first time when he became involved with a Norwegian temperance lodge in Chicago in the late 1880s. The lodge had a small-circulation monthly newspaper, and Ager began writing articles for it. Ager remained a teetotaler his entire life, before, during, and after the decade-long period of Prohibition in the United States.

== Newspaper editor and writer ==
Ager's newspaper career began in earnest when, at the age of 23, he moved to Eau Claire, Wisconsin, after being offered a job at a Norwegian temperance newspaper called Reform. Ager was associated with Reform (both the newspaper and literal reform), for the rest of his life. The editor of Reform died in 1903 and Ager took over the position. Eventually Ager came to own the paper. Reform folded shortly after Ager's death in 1941.

In addition to his long newspaper career, Ager penned six novels and numerous collections of short stories. Although he never achieved the commercial success of his friend, Ole Edvart Rølvaag, Ager's body of work is thought to be on many levels, comparable with and sometimes superior to that of Rølvaag. A humorist in the tradition of Mark Twain, Ager specialized in character sketches, and dramatizing the tragicomic plight of the Norwegian immigrant. Some of his more important works, translated into English, are Christ before Pilate, On The Way to The Melting Pot, Sons of The Old Country, and I Sit Alone.

Ager was also a popular orator, traveling the stump circuit for much of his career, speaking wherever Norwegian-Americans gathered. For Syttende Mai in 1916, Ager shared a platform with William Jennings Bryan. The city of Eau Claire meant more to Ager than just a career. It was here that Ager met a Norwegian immigrant girl from Tromsø, Norway, named Gurolle Blestren. Ager and Blestren married and raised nine children in a home that still stands near Half Moon Lake in Eau Claire, Wisconsin. The house, now known as the Brady Anderson and Waldemar Ager House, is listed on the National Register of Historic Places and has been designated a Literary Landmark by the National Association of Friends of Public Libraries.

== Selected bibliography ==
- Kristus for Pilatus. En Norsk-Amerikansk Fortælling (1910) (translation titled "Christ before Pilate: An American Story", published in 1924)
- Oberst Heg og hans Gutter (1916) (translation by Della Kittleson Catuna, Clarence A. Clausen titled "Colonel Heg and His Boys", published in 2000)
- Paa Veien til Smeltepotten (1917) (translation by Harry T. Cleven as "On the Way to the Melting Pot", published in 1995)
- Gamlelandets Sønner (1926) (translation by Trygve Ager as "Sons of the Old Country", published in 1983)
- Hundeøine (1929) (translation by Charles Wharton Stork as "I Sit Alone", published in 1931)

== Other sources ==
- Haugen, Einar (1989) Immigrant Idealist: A Literary Biography of Waldemar Ager, (Northfield, MN: Norwegian-American Historical Association) ISBN 9780877320777
- Øverland, Orm (1996) The Western Home - A Literary History of Norwegian America (Northfield, MN: Norwegian-American Historical Association) ISBN 978-0252023279
- Gulliksen, Øyvind T. (2004) Twofold Identities: Norwegian-American Contributions to Midwestern Literature (Peter Lang International Academic Publishers) ISBN 9780820462301
- Thaler, Paul (1998) Norwegian Minds-- American Dreams: Ethnic Activism Among Norwegian-American Intellectuals (University of Delaware Press) ISBN 9780874136296
