= California Wine and Liquor Store =

- U.S. National Register of Historic Places
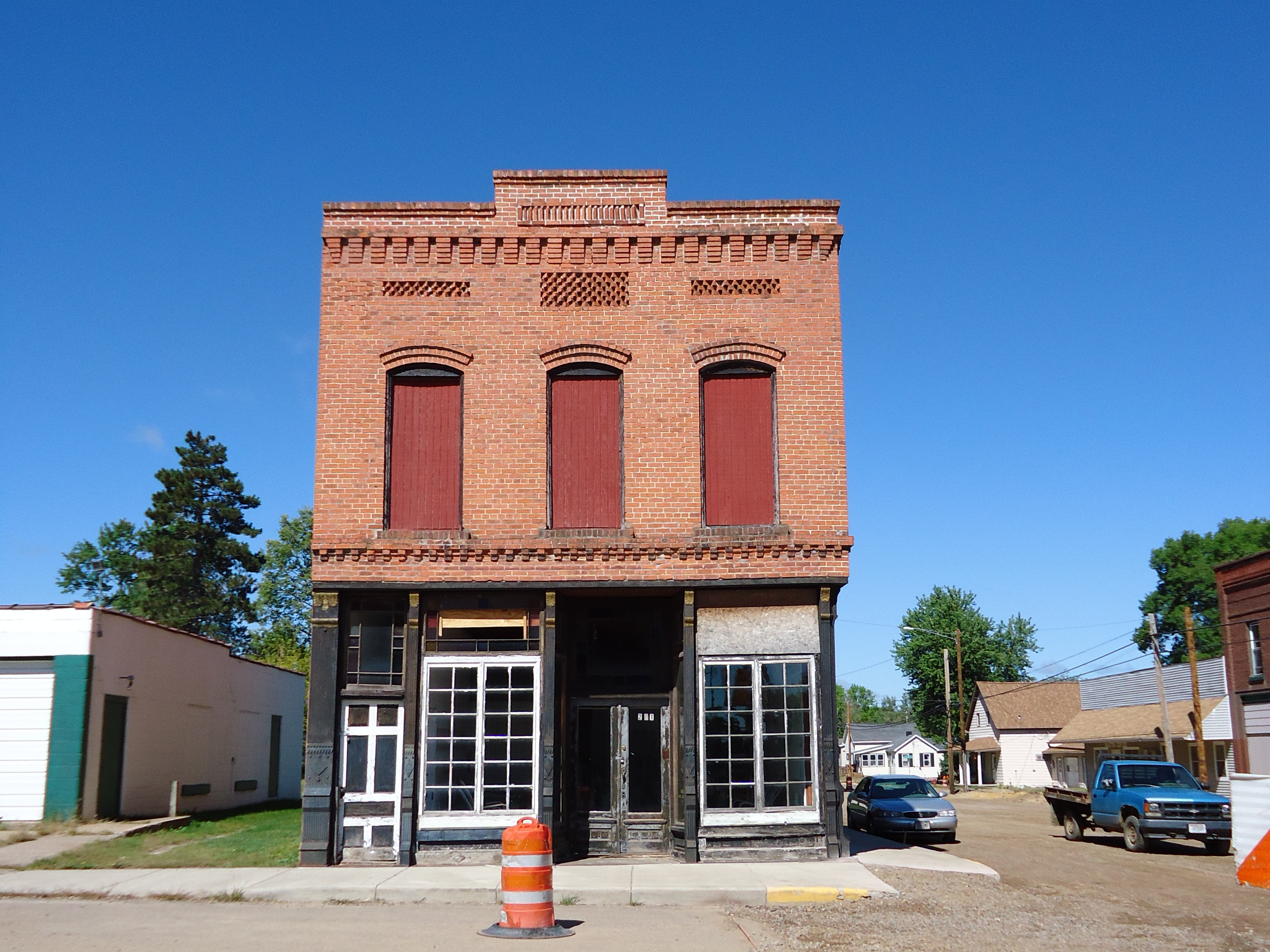
- California Wine and Liquor Store

- Location within Wisconsin Location within the United States
- Location: 201 Farmers St., Fairchild, Wisconsin
- Coordinates: 44°36′03″N 90°57′55″W
- Area: less than one acre
- Built: 1896
- Architectural style: Early Commercial
- NRHP reference No.: 82000666
- Added to NRHP: March 1, 1982

The California Wine and Liquor Store is located in Fairchild, Wisconsin. It was listed on the National Register of Historic Places in 1982 and on the State Register of Historic Places in 1989.
