= Salsbury Row House =

Historic house in Wisconsin, United States

- U.S. National Register of Historic Places
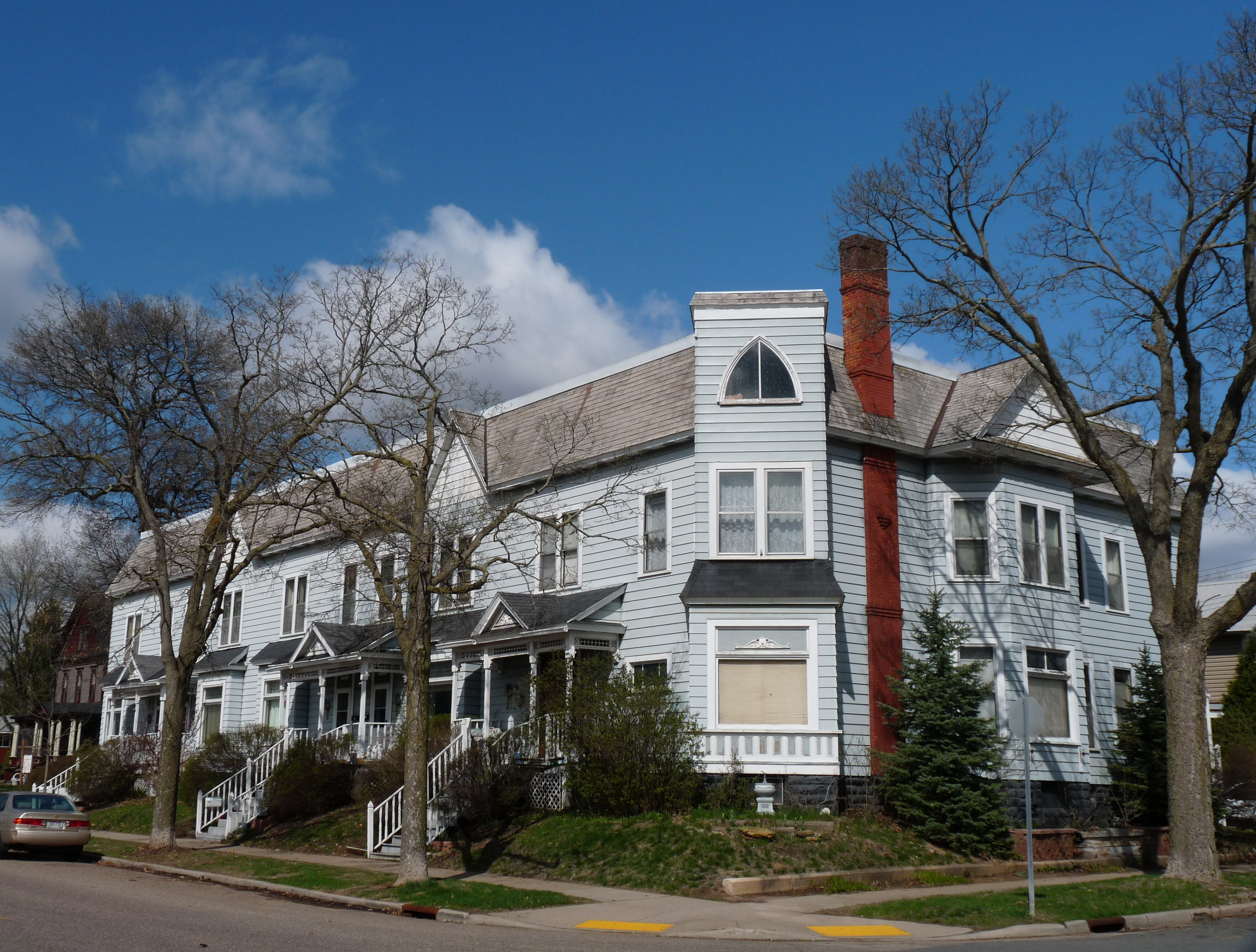

- Location within Wisconsin Location within the United States
- Location: 302-310 W. Grand Ave., Eau Claire, Wisconsin
- Coordinates: 44°48′32″N 91°30′19″W
- Area: less than one acre
- Built: 1891
- Architectural style: Queen Anne
- NRHP reference No.: 09000220
- Added to NRHP: April 15, 2009

The Salsbury Row House is located in Eau Claire, Wisconsin. It was added to the National Register of Historic Places in 2009.

== History ==
The house was built for James F. Salsbury. It was then owned by brother and sister William and Mae Kelley in the early part of the 20th century.
