= Brady Anderson and Waldemar Ager House =

Historic house in Wisconsin, United States

- U.S. National Register of Historic Places
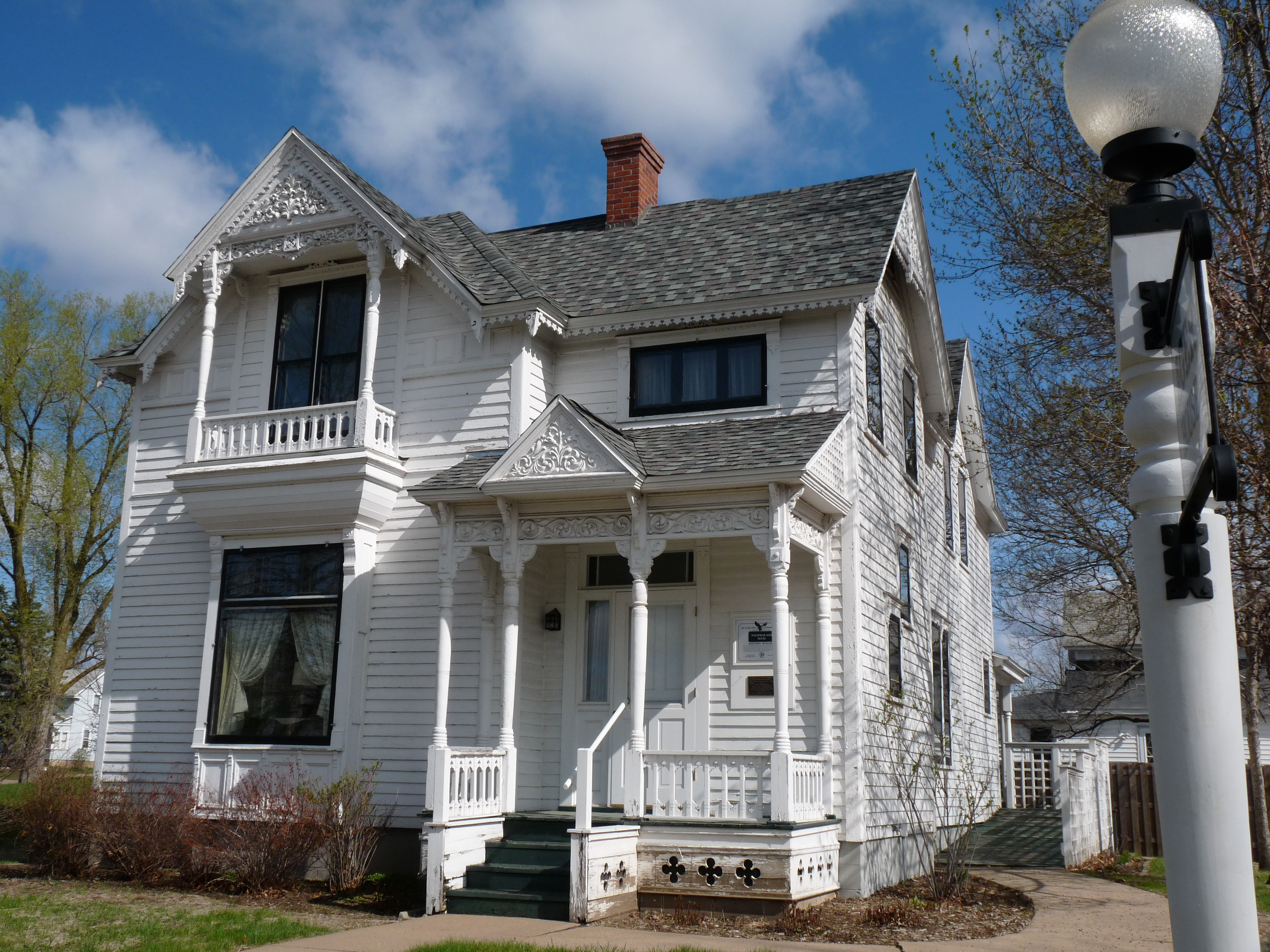

- Location within Wisconsin Location within the United States
- Location: 514 W. Madison St. Eau Claire, Wisconsin
- Coordinates: 44°48′57″N 91°30′51″W
- Built: 1894
- Architect: Brady Anderson
- Architectural style: Queen Anne
- NRHP reference No.: 00000190
- Added to NRHP: March 16, 2000

The Brady Anderson and Waldemar Ager House is a historic house located at 514 West Madison Street in Eau Claire, Wisconsin. It was added to the National Register of Historic Places in 2000. Additionally, it has been designated a Literary Landmark by the National Association of Friends of Public Libraries.

== History ==
The house was built from 1892 to 1894 by craftsman Brady Anderson. It was purchased by Norwegian newspaperman and author Waldemar Ager in 1903. The Ager family owned the house until 1962, when it was bought by the local hospital. In 1993, when the hospital needed the land to expand its complex, the house was donated to the Waldemar Ager Foundation. Originally located on Chestnut Street, the house was then moved to its current location. Afterwards, the house was restored to its appearance during the 1900s. The second floor has since been converted into a resource library.
