= Saint Edward's Chapel =

- U.S. National Register of Historic Places
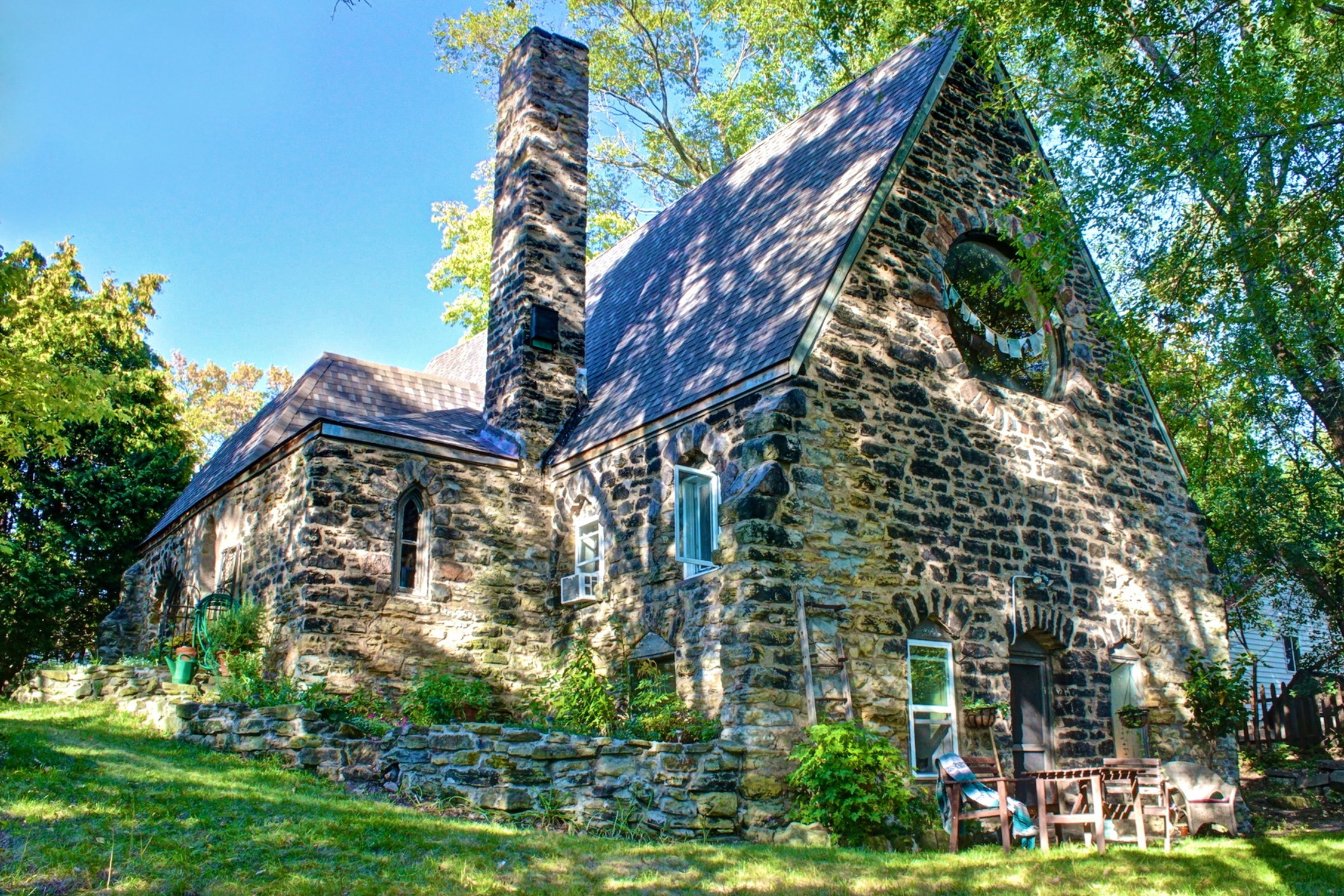
- Location: 1129 Bellevue Ave. Eau Claire, Wisconsin
- Architectural style: Gothic Revival
- NRHP reference No.: 99001661
- Added to NRHP: January 7, 2000

Saint Edward's Chapel in Eau Claire, Wisconsin was constructed in 1889–1896 in the Gothic Revival style. It was added to the National Register of Historic Places for its religious significance in 2000.

The chapel closed for worship in 1918 and became a private house. The building is now a Montessori preschool.
