= Union Auto Company =

- U.S. National Register of Historic Places
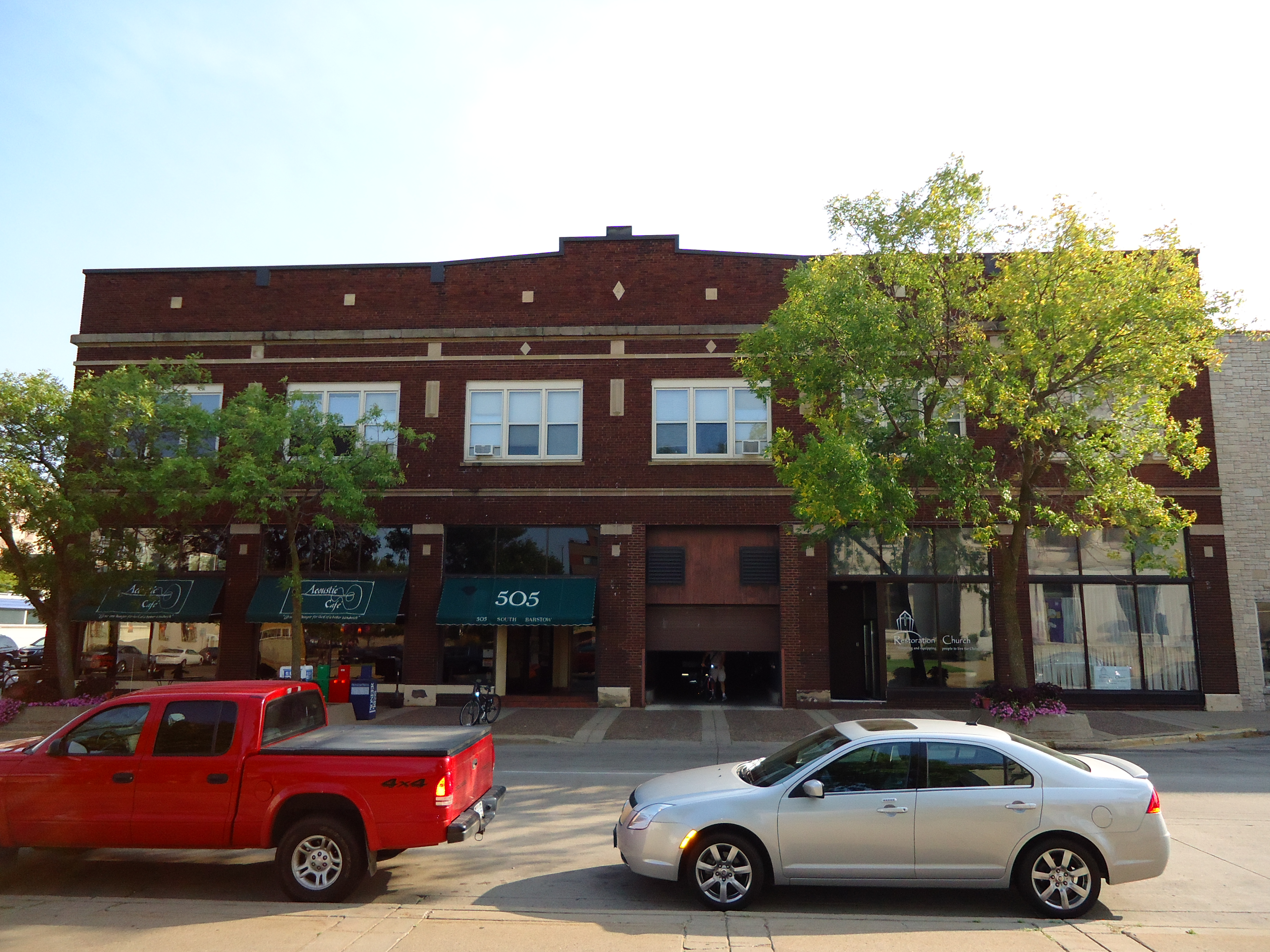
- Location: 505 S. Barstow St. Eau Claire, Wisconsin
- Coordinates: 44.80935°N 91.49754°W
- Built: 1917
- NRHP reference No.: 07001085
- Added to NRHP: October 11, 2007

The Union Auto Company is located in Eau Claire, Wisconsin. In 2007, the building was added to the National Register of Historic Places.

== History ==
The building was constructed for automobile sales and repairs. From 1917 to 1975, multiple auto-related businesses ran their operations from the site. In 1977, the upper portion of the building was converted into apartments and in 1980, what was once a showroom was converted into a bar and restaurant. Additionally, other parts of the building are now used for religious functions and the basement serves as a parking garage.
