= Sarge Boyd Bandshell =

Historic place in Wisconsin, United States

- Owen Park Bandshell
- U.S. National Register of Historic Places
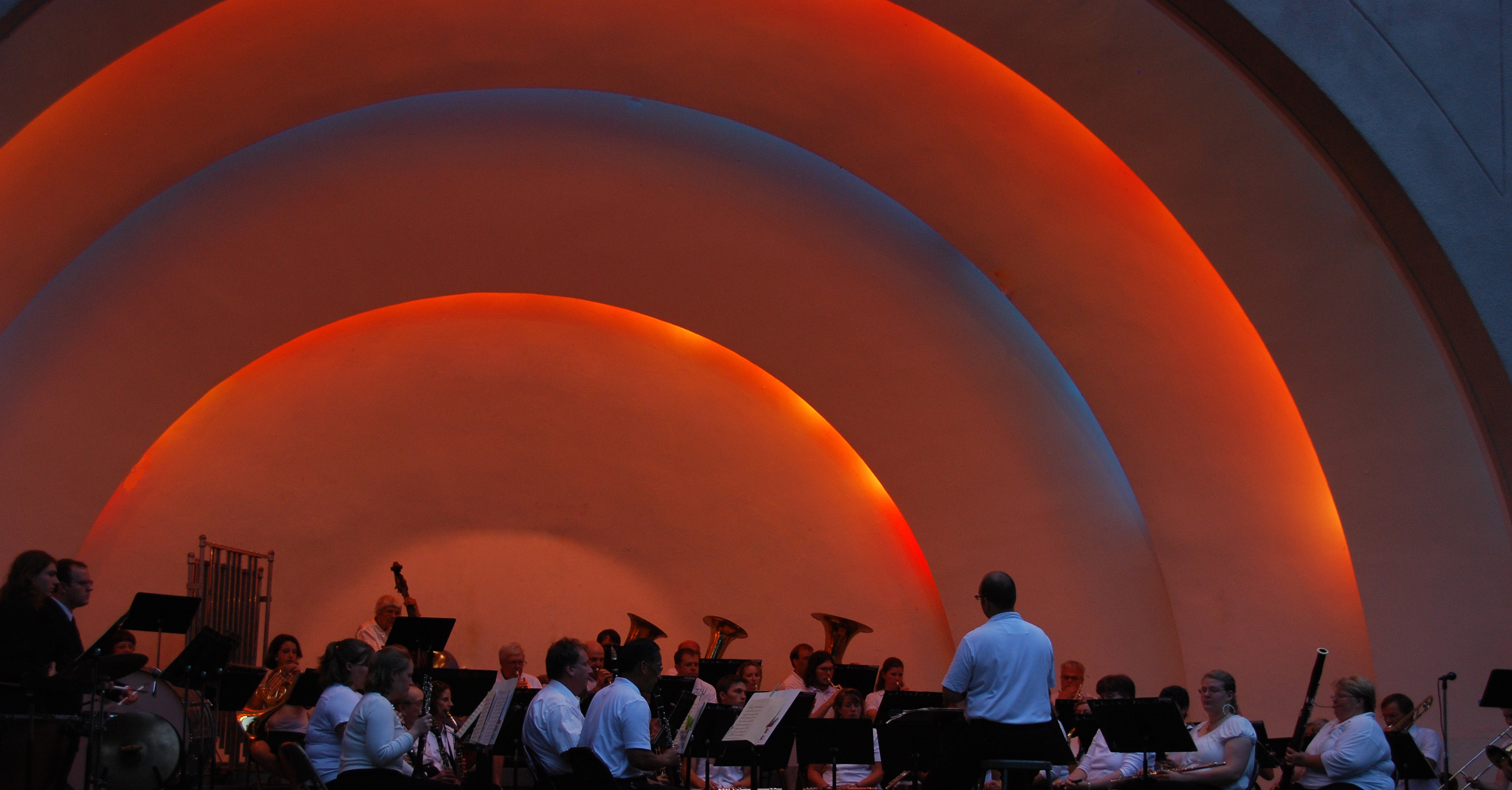

- Location within Wisconsin Location within the United States
- Location: Owen Park; 501 First Avenue; Eau Claire, Wisconsin
- Coordinates: 44°48′19″N 91°29′58″W
- Area: less than one acre
- Built: 1938
- Architect: Alexander Garnock
- Architectural style: Art Deco
- NRHP reference No.: 03000896
- Added to NRHP: September 02, 2003

The Sarge Boyd Bandshell of Eau Claire, Wisconsin, United States, as home to the city's oldest community musical organization, has played a significant role in the cultural development of the entire Chippewa Valley. The structure was designed by city engineer Alexander Garnock for the purpose of showcasing the Eau Claire Municipal Band. Although its official name is the Donald I. "Sarge" Boyd Bandshell, it was listed on the National Register of Historic Places in 2003 as the Owen Park Bandshell.

== History ==
Built in 1938, it was a project of the Works Progress Administration costing $10,000 and taking 111 man months to complete.

In addition to the Municipal Band concerts, the historic bandshell, which has often been described as the "centerpiece" of Owen Park, has been used for weddings, church services, speeches, plays, movies, festivals, fairs, and other types of public gatherings. Since 2009 the Chippewa Valley Blues Society has hosted the Tuesday Night Blues concert series at the bandshell from Memorial Day to Labor Day. The 2020 season was cancelled due to the COVID-19 pandemic.

In 1992 it was dedicated to master showman Donald I. "Sarge" Boyd whose half century of musical contributions to the city have had a profound impact on virtually everyone who worked under his direction.

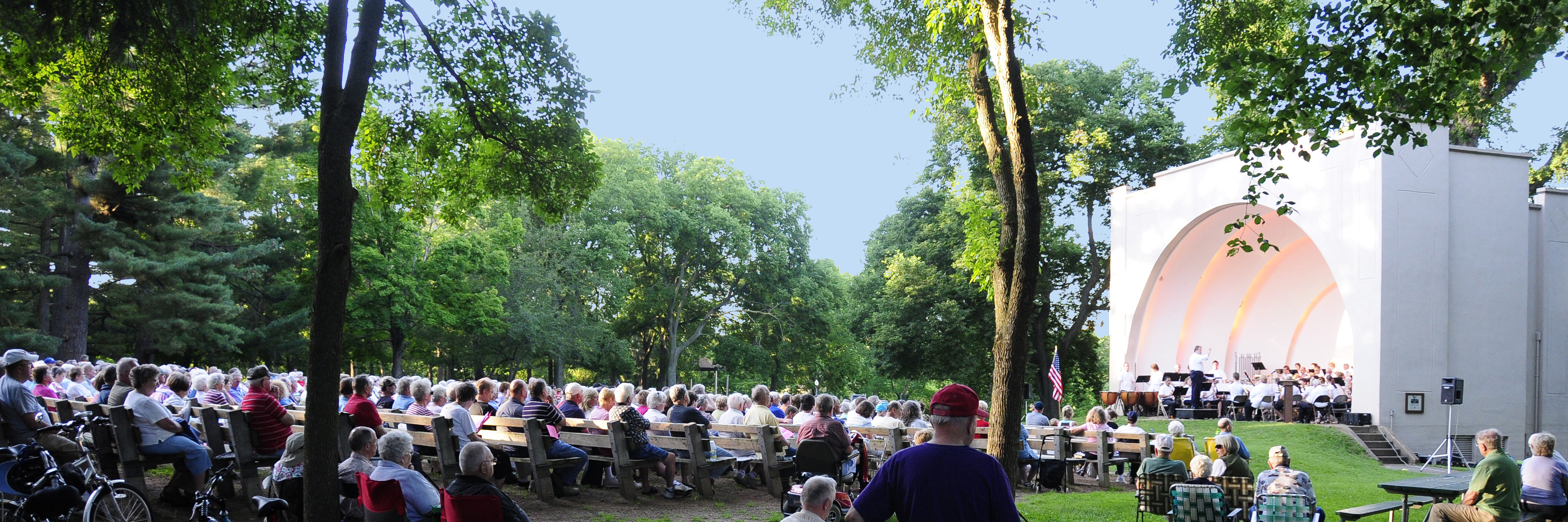
