= Eau Claire Masonic Center =

- Temple of Free Masonry
- U.S. National Register of Historic Places
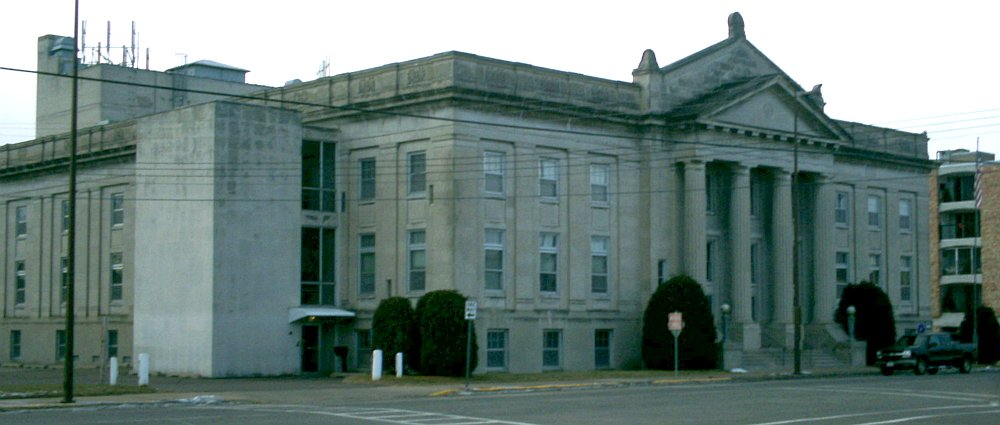

- Location within Wisconsin Location within the United States
- Location: 616 Graham Avenue; Eau Claire, Wisconsin
- Coordinates: 44°48′27″N 91°29′53″W
- Area: less than one acre
- Built: 1927
- Architect: Edward J. Hancock
- Architectural style: Neoclassical
- NRHP reference No.: 87002450
- Added to NRHP: January 14, 1988

The Eau Claire Masonic Center, also known as the Temple of Free Masonry, is a historic Masonic building located at 616 Graham Avenue in Eau Claire, Wisconsin. It was built in 1927 in the Neoclassical architectural style and was listed on the National Register of Historic Places in 1988.

The building was designed by Edward J. Hancock and contains 47,000 square feet (4,400 m^{2}) of floor space, including an auditorium, ballroom, dining room, meeting rooms, and offices. It served historically as a meeting hall for Masonic orders. Since the mid-1990s it has also been the rain/rehearsal site for the Eau Claire Municipal Band.
