= Orlando Brice House =

Historic house in Wisconsin, United States

- U.S. National Register of Historic Places
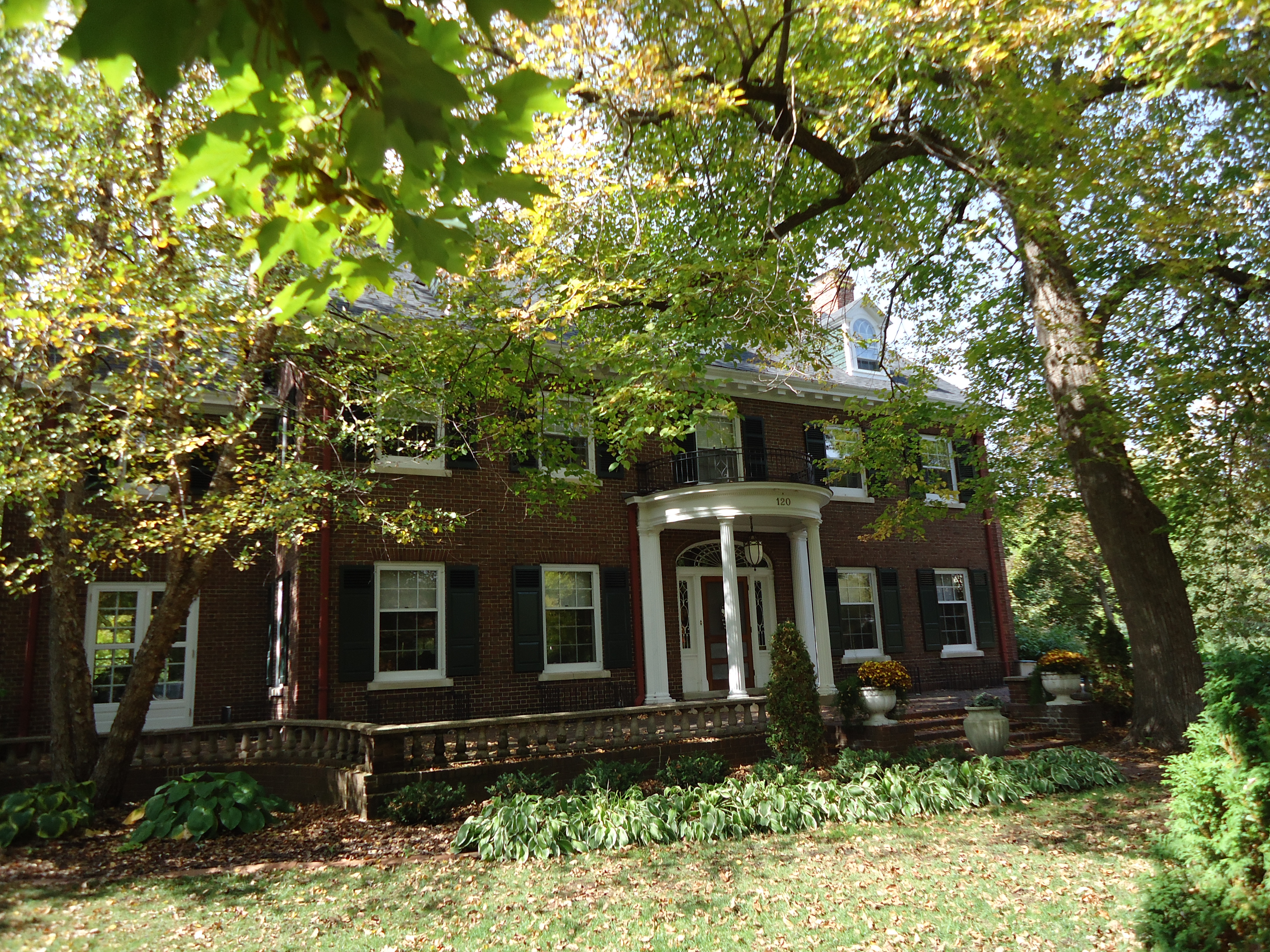
- Orlando Brice House

- Location within Wisconsin Location within the United States
- Location: 120 Marston Ave., Eau Claire, Wisconsin
- Coordinates: 44°48′14″N 91°29′47″W
- Area: less than one acre
- Built: 1918
- Architectural style: Colonial Revival
- MPS: Eau Claire MRA
- NRHP reference No.: 83003376
- Added to NRHP: January 28, 1983

The Orlando Brice House is located in Eau Claire, Wisconsin.

== History ==
Orlando Brice was an executive at a refrigerator company. The house was listed on the National Register of Historic Places in 1983 and on the State Register of Historic Places in 1989.
