= David Drummond House =

Historic house in Wisconsin, United States

- U.S. National Register of Historic Places
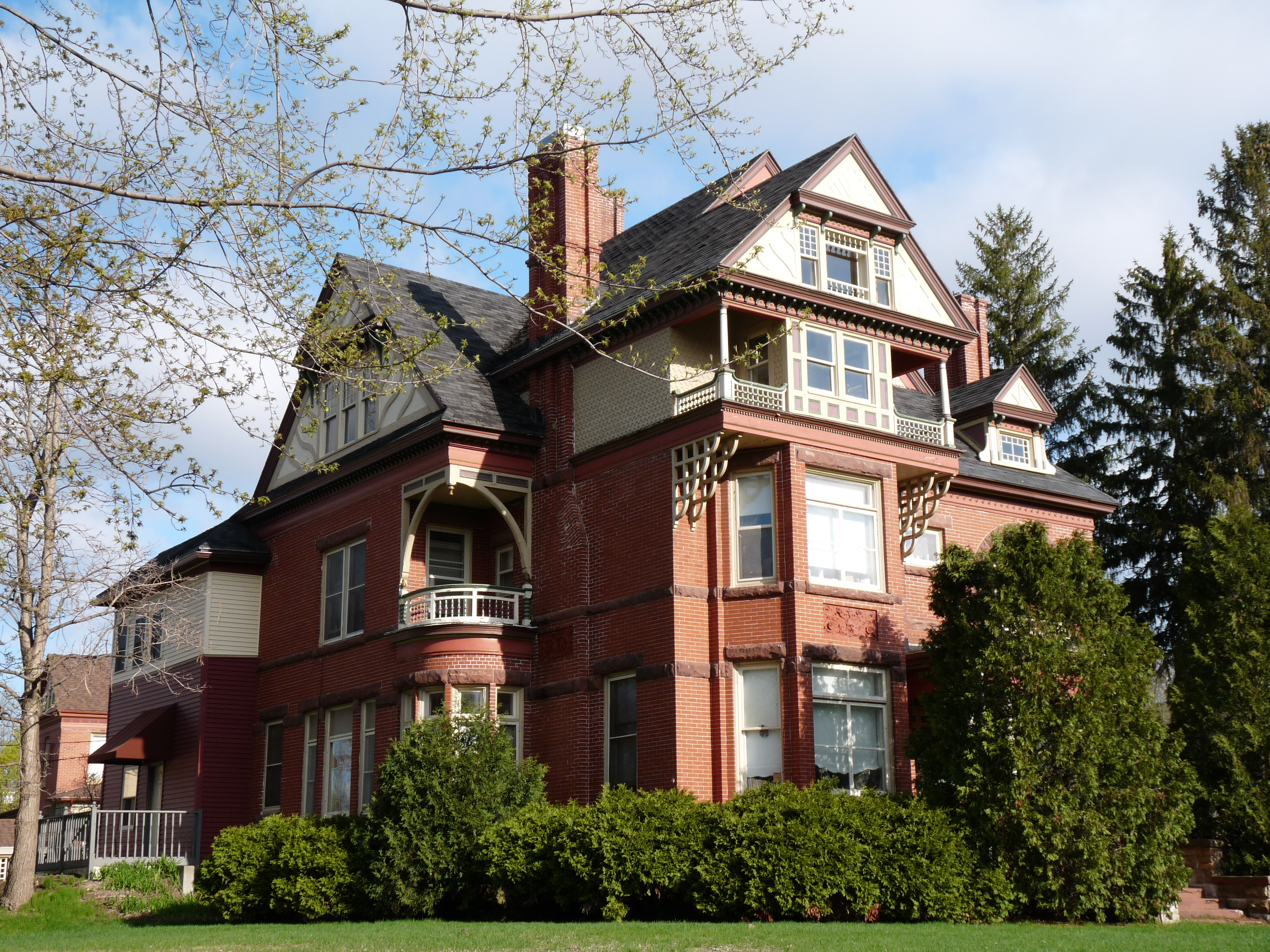
- David Drummond House
- Location: 1310 State St., Eau Claire, Wisconsin
- Coordinates: 44°48′05″N 91°29′44″W
- Area: less than one acre
- Built: 1888
- Architectural style: Queen Anne
- NRHP reference No.: 74000087
- Added to NRHP: July 30, 1974

The David Drummond House is located in Eau Claire, Wisconsin.

== History ==
David Drummond was a Canadian immigrant who founded a number of businesses in Eau Claire. The house was listed on the National Register of Historic Places in 1974 and on the State Register of Historic Places in 1989.

On September 12th, 2025, the house was struck by lightning and after over six hours of firefighting, the fire was extinguished. During the fire, over 70% of the roof was burned and the rest of the roof collapsed into the 3rd floor. At this time, the home owners are planning on a complete demolition of the house.
