= St. Joseph's Chapel (Eau Claire, Wisconsin) =

- U.S. National Register of Historic Places
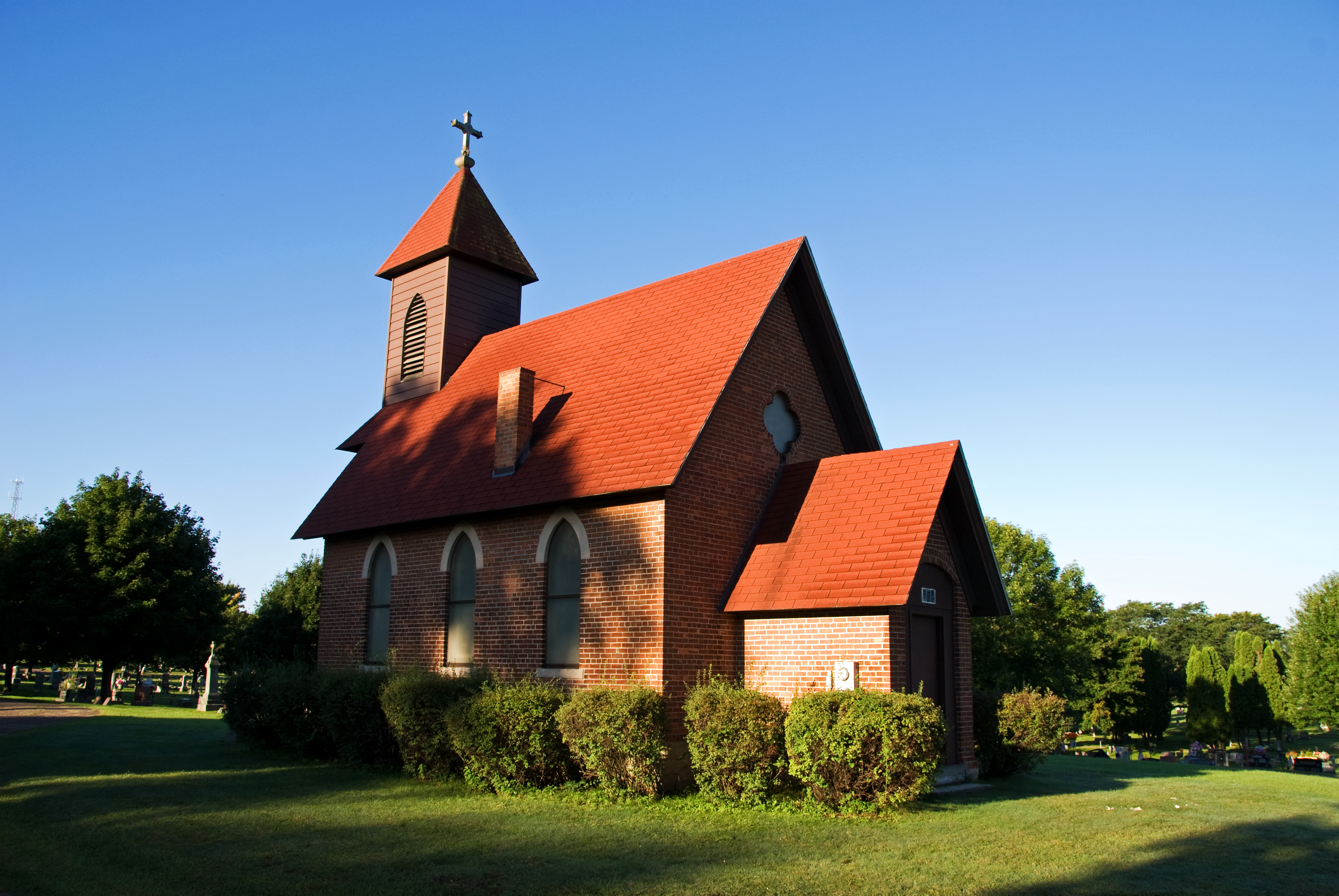
- Location: Omaha St. Eau Claire, Wisconsin
- Coordinates: 44°49′27″N 91°28′50″W
- Built: 1896
- Architect: Joseph Bemish
- Architectural style: Gothic Revival
- NRHP reference No.: 87002436
- Added to NRHP: January 14, 1988

St. Joseph's Chapel is a historic chapel located in Sacred Heart Cemetery in Eau Claire, Wisconsin. The chapel was used by the German Catholic congregation of Sacred Heart Parish. The Gothic Revival structure was built in 1896 by parishioner Joseph Bemish. It was added to the National Register of Historic Places in 1988 for its architectural significance.

== History ==
Sacred Heart Parish, Eau Claire's German-speaking Catholic congregation, formed in 1875, when it split off from St. Patrick's Church. Parishioner Joseph Bemish built St. Joseph's Chapel in the church cemetery in 1896. On the cornerstone was written "St. Joseph's Kapelle 1896." St. Joseph chapel was commissioned by Rev. John Metzler (pastor at Sacred Heart church for six years) in memory of their former pastor, Rev. Joseph Boehm, who died on August 23, 1893. The chapel was dedicated in June 1897, and the remains of Rev. Boehm were exhumed and placed in the vault with solemn ceremonies led by Bishop James Schwebach of the Diocese of La Crosse. The "National Register of Historic Places Registration Form" shows Rev. Paul Geyer (who died August 15, 1899) and Rev. John Metzler (who died November 27, 1907) were also entombed in the vault. However, Metzler was buried at Calvary Cemetery in Chippewa Falls in the largest procession ever held in that city. The chapel held occasional Masses until November 1943. Rev. John Peltz had the bodies removed from the vault, and they were reburied in the cemetery. The chapel remained unused for several decades and was used to store cemetery maintenance equipment. In 1982, the congregation renovated the chapel under the guidance of Rev. Peter Eiden.

== Architecture ==
The chapel is a one-room red brick structure with a Gothic Revival design. A tower rises above the church's front entrance; it features arched openings on each side and a cross at its peak. Arched stained glass windows flank the entrance and run along the sides of the building; a transom window above the entrance doorway matches the shape of these windows. A quatrefoil stained glass window is situated atop the arch of the transom. The chapel's interior features a carved wooden relief at the altar and a hand-painted ceiling.
