= McNutt =

McNutt is a surname of either Scottish or Irish origin. It refers to:

Persons

- Alexander McNutt (1725–1811), British army officer, colonist, and land agent
- Alexander McNutt (1802–1848), American politician from Mississippi; governor and state senator
- Charles H. McNutt (1928–2017), American archaeologist
- Chris McNutt (born 1986), American conservative activist and gun rights lobbyist
- Clarence McNutt (1907–1972), American canoeist
- James R. McNutt (1935–2024), American politician from Michigan
- John McNutt (1914–1992), Irish Anglican priest
- John G. McNutt, American professor and author
- Marcia McNutt (born 1952), American geophysicist and oceanographer
- Marvin McNutt (born 1989), American football wide receiver for the Carolina Panthers
- Mollie McNutt (1885–1919), Australian poet
- Monica McNutt (born 1989), American basketball analyst and former player
- Paul V. McNutt (1891–1955), American politician from Indiana; governor, high commissioner, ambassador, and federal agency administrator
- Ronnie McNutt (1987–2020), American veteran who fatally shot himself on a Facebook livestream
- Russell Alton McNutt (1914–2008), American engineer and alleged spy
- Sarah McNutt (1839–1930), American physician
- Tico McNutt, American wildlife researcher
- Todd McNutt (born 1964), Canadian former cyclist
- Walter McNutt (born 1940), Montana State Senate
- William Slavens McNutt (1885–1938), American screenwriter

Fictional persons

- Boob McNutt, comic strip by Rube Goldberg 1915–34

== See also ==
- MacNutt (surname)
