= John McNutt =

John McNutt may refer to:

- John G. McNutt, professor of urban affairs at the University of Delaware
- Tico McNutt (John McNutt), conservation biologist
- John McNutt (priest) (1914–1992), Dean of Clogher
