= George Floyd protests in Wisconsin =

2020 civil unrest after the murder of George Floyd

- Part of George Floyd protests
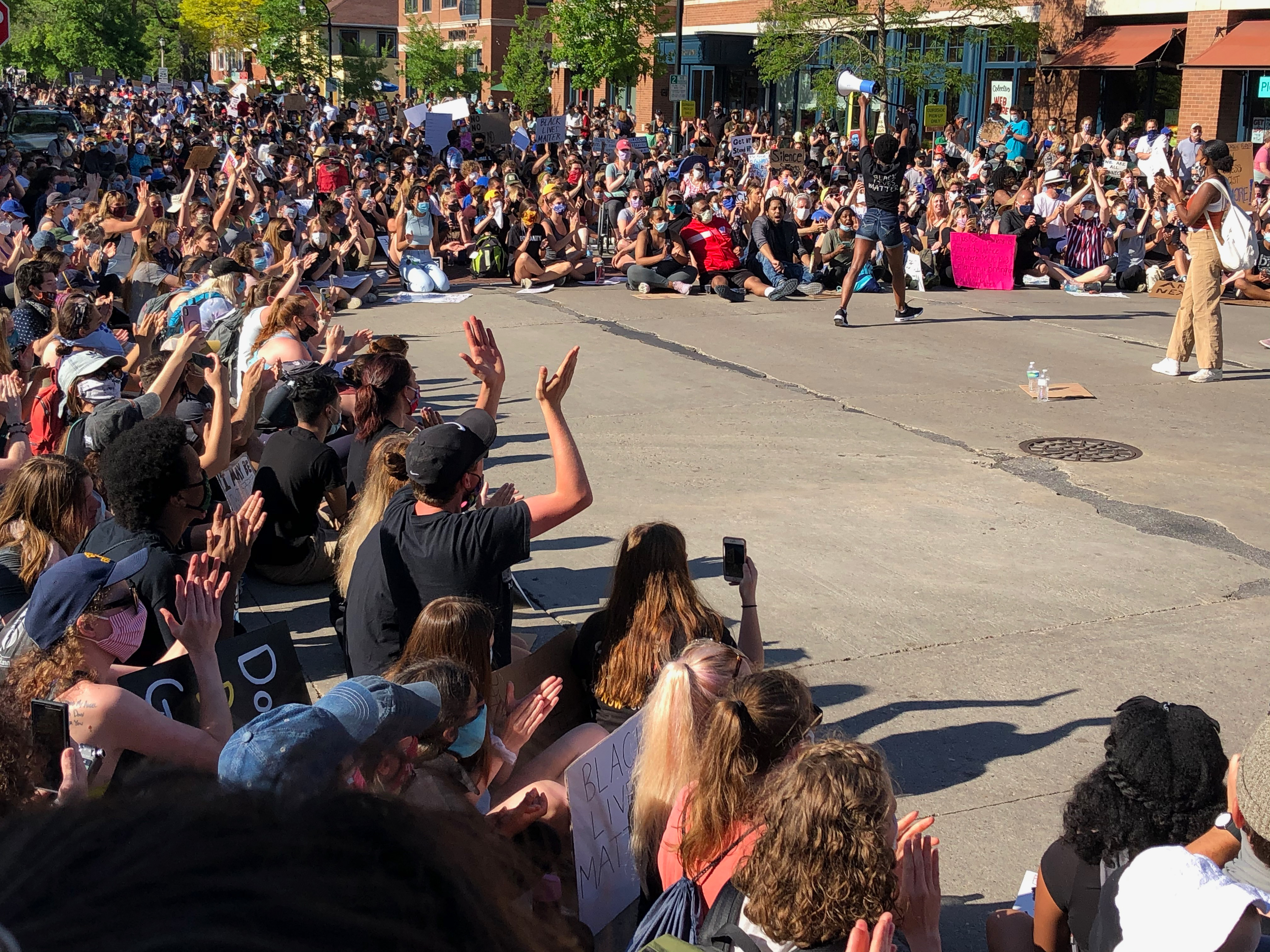
- Black Lives Matter protesters in Shorewood on June 6
- Date: May 29 – September 1, 2020 (3 months and 3 days)
- Location: Wisconsin, United States
- Caused by: Police brutality; Institutional racism against African Americans; Reaction to the murder of George Floyd; Economic, racial and social inequality

Cities in Wisconsin in which a protest with about 100 or more participants was held

This is a list of protests held in Wisconsin related to the 2020 murder of George Floyd in neighboring Minnesota. Additional protests occurred in late August in Kenosha, Wisconsin in the aftermath of the shooting of Jacob Blake. Protests also occurred in 2020 in Wauwatosa, Wisconsin during the aftermath of the shooting of Alvin Cole.

== Locations ==
=== Appleton ===
Over one thousand people gathered in downtown Appleton on May 30 and 31 for a peaceful protest down College Avenue to Houdini Plaza and the Appleton Police Department.

=== Eau Claire ===
Hundreds marched from Phoenix Park to Owen Park through downtown Eau Claire on May 31. On June 5 another rally was held in Phoenix Park followed by a march of reportedly thousands through the streets of downtown Eau Claire.

=== Fond du Lac ===
On May 31, dozens marched along Johnson Street to protest police brutality and the murder of George Floyd.

=== Franklin ===
Over two hundred protesters marched through the city and held a peaceful rally on June 11, starting at the Franklin library.

=== Green Bay ===
On the evening of May 30 and the afternoon of May 31, there were peaceful protests held in downtown Green Bay. However, on the evening of the 31st, a Marathon gas station was looted, and several shots were fired. The police began firing rubber pellets at the protesters, at which point, the crowd began throwing rocks at the police. Police dispersed the crowd with gas. On June 7, an estimated 1,000–2,500 people showed up to march across the Walnut Street Bridge and protest police brutality after the murder of George Floyd, making it the largest protest in recent Green Bay history. The crowds were so big that the intended path for the protest, walking from Leicht Memorial Park to the Green Bay Police Department, needed to be scrapped. Organizers stated that activists from groups that were not previously familiar with one another united as a form of grieving and solidarity in the hope to achieve wide-scale police reform. The protest was completely peaceful, with no arrests or incidents of looting and vandalism reported. Activists later took to City Hall looking to remove a curfew put in by Green Bay police, mayor Eric Genrich and the majority of city council members; the curfew was set to curb looting and vandalism that had occurred at times from previous protests.

=== Kenosha ===
Between 100 and 125 demonstrators peacefully marched through downtown Kenosha on May 31. Members of the City Council supported the peaceful protests while condemning the violent ones in Milwaukee. After the shooting of Jacob Blake on August 23, further protests broke out in Kenosha which resulted in 2 protesters being shot and killed.

=== La Crosse ===
On the evening of May 29 and 30, 2020, there were peaceful protests held in downtown La Crosse. June 3: Nearly 700 protesters marched from Riverside Park and to City Hall. Demonstrators kneeled for nine minutes and speakers talked about their own local experiences of racism. In response the La Crosse Police Department launched a "transparency tab" on their website to better inform the public on how they operate.

=== Madison ===
On May 30, there was a peaceful demonstration at the State Capitol with around 1,000 attendees. As the evening progressed, it evolved into a riot with some storefronts on State Street being damaged, and a conflict with police that was met with tear gas. A neighborhood curfew was declared by Mayor Satya Rhodes-Conway.

On June 23, in response to the arrest of activist Devonere Johnson, who had caused a disturbance in a restaurant with a baseball bat and a bullhorn, around 300 protesters blocked traffic, caused damage to several buildings, and toppled two statues. State Senator Tim Carpenter was also attacked by protesters.

=== Marinette ===
On the early afternoon of June 3, a peaceful protest was held on Stephenson Island, which is on the state line between Wisconsin and Michigan and alongside US HWY 41. Close to 100 protesters attended. Some local businesses were boarded up and closed for the day, and another business had volunteer personnel in army camouflage, armed with semi-automatic rifles standing-by. Many drove by and made vulgar gestures and remarks toward protesters, but no violence erupted.

=== Milwaukee ===
On May 29, hundreds of protesters in Milwaukee blocked highways and organized a vehicle procession that traveled several miles. There were reports of looting and mild arson at a Walgreens pharmacy, as well as the looting of a Boost Mobile store. Several other businesses were damaged. In addition, one police officer was mildly injured by gunfire. Protests over the killing of Joel Acevedo by an off-duty Milwaukee police officer were prompted by the George Floyd protests.

On June 2, protesters gathered at Humboldt Park and marched to the south side of Milwaukee, where they demonstrated outside City Hall and Milwaukee Police District 1. Police used tear gas on protesters and reports were made that Molotov cocktails were thrown at officers. Protesters on the Hoan Bridge walked off into traffic, where protest organizer Frank Nitty was apprehended and beaten by police. On June 7, members of the Milwaukee Bucks, including players, coaches, staff and ownership, participated in a rally in honor of George Floyd. The march was led by Bucks star Sterling Brown, who held a nine-second moment of silence for Floyd and shared his experiences with police brutality. On June 9, protesters again gathered at Humboldt Park to demonstrate against racism and police brutality.

=== Oshkosh ===
On May 31, hundreds of protesters gathered at the Sun Dial and marched around Main Street to peacefully protest the murder of George Floyd. During the march, they stopped at the Oshkosh Police Department and lied down for eight minutes.

=== Racine ===
On May 31, a small crowd gathered at Monument Square to protest the murder of George Floyd. The crowd eventually grew to hundreds, and although the event started peacefully, protesters eventually began to set off fireworks, verbally assault police officers, and set fire to a Community Oriented Policing House on Villa Street. The crowd was dispersed when police fired tear gas. A more peaceful protest was held on June 1 with over 200 protesters.

=== Sheboygan ===
On June 2, over a hundred people gathered at the Sheboygan County Courthouse and marched through the downtown area to protest police brutality and the murder of George Floyd.

=== Shorewood ===
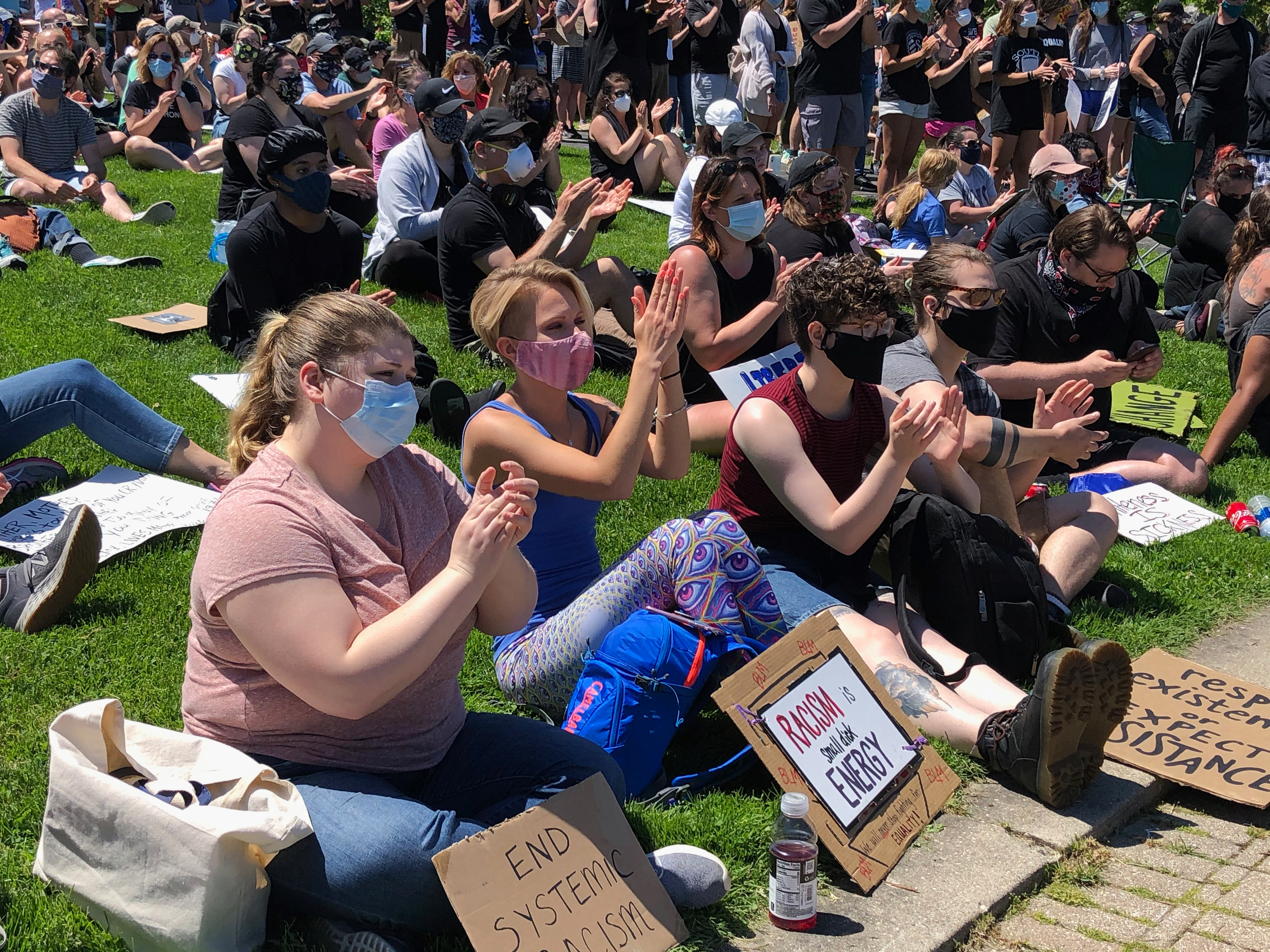
Protesters at a peaceful protest held in the North Shore suburbs of Milwaukee on June 6, 2020

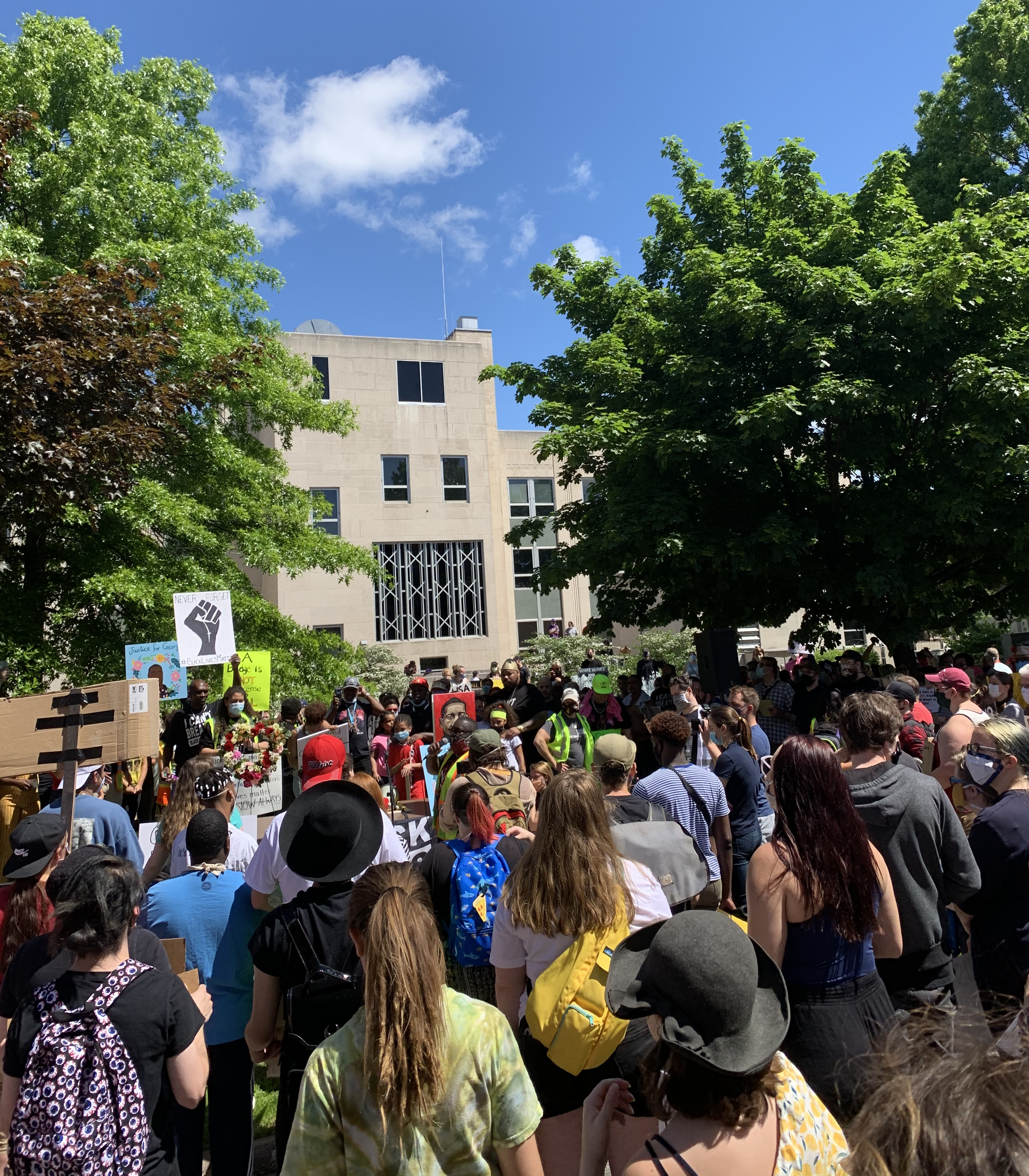
Protesters in Wausau

On June 6, 2020, thousands of people protested peacefully in a march from Shorewood to Whitefish Bay and back. Hand sanitizer, masks, snacks, and bottles of water were handed out by volunteers. Residents along the route showed their support by standing in their yards holding up signs.

A 64-year-old white probate lawyer interrupted the protest by parking in the middle of the street and then spat on a 17-year-old black high school student. The spitter was arrested and faced both "charges of battery and disorderly conduct" and "a professional misconduct complaint as a lawyer". The following day, the spitter confronted protesters outside her house, and police arrived at her home to arrest her. Resisting arrest, the spitter kneed one of the officers in the groin, and faced "additional charges of battery of a law enforcement officer and resisting arrest".

=== Wausau ===
On the afternoon of May 29, approximately 150 to 200 people participated in a protest near the Marathon County Courthouse in downtown Wausau.
