= Nuttby, Nova Scotia =

Community in Nova Scotia, Canada

Coordinates: 45°31′46.1″N 63°12′21.21″W

Nuttby in Nova Scotia

Nuttby is an unincorporated community in the Canadian province of Nova Scotia, located in Colchester County. The community is named for the McNutt family. The first land grants in the area were given to John and Thomas McNutt in 1856.
