= Senator Nutt =

Senator Nutt may refer to:

- Roger Nutt (born 1965), South Carolina State Senate
- William Nutt (1836–1909), Massachusetts State Senate

== See also ==
- Senator McNutt (disambiguation)
