= 2020 American athlete strikes =

Strike actions by athletes in response to the shooting of Jacob Blake

- Date: August 26, 2020
- Location: Canada and United States
- Type: Strike
- Theme: Shooting of Jacob Blake
- Participants: National Basketball Association; Women's National Basketball Association; Major League Baseball; Major League Soccer; Women's Tennis Association; National Hockey League; National Football League

On August 26, 2020, some professional athletes in the United States began to go on strike for their respective sports contests in response to the police shooting of Jacob Blake in Kenosha, Wisconsin. After the video of the shooting in which he was seriously injured went viral, protests and riots broke out in the city of Kenosha and elsewhere. As a result of the shooting of Blake and the protests which followed, on August 26, professional athletes refused to play in their scheduled sports events, beginning with the Milwaukee Bucks of the National Basketball Association (NBA).

Some athletes in the NBA, Women's National Basketball Association (WNBA), Major League Baseball (MLB), and Major League Soccer (MLS) decided not to play their games on August 26. Also on that day, the Women's Tennis Association Cincinnati Masters organizers postponed the tournament for one day to August 27, 2020. The strikes extended into August 27 and 28 when players from the National Hockey League (NHL) walked out of their playoff games. In response to the athlete strikes, nine National Football League (NFL) teams canceled their scheduled practices on August 27, 2020. The athlete strikes occurred as part of the broader racial unrest in the United States since 2020.

== Professional athletic strikes ==
In response to the police shooting of Jacob Blake in Kenosha, Wisconsin, professional athletes in the United States walked out of and refused to play in their scheduled sporting events.

The broader protests were organized under the Black Lives Matter (BLM) movement, which advocates non-violent civil disobedience to protest against police brutality and racially motivated violence against black people. The Black Lives Matter logo was displayed on the National Basketball Association (NBA) courts during the 2020 playoffs. When the NBA restarted the 2019–20 season in July 2020, NBA players knelt during the national anthem, with each player wearing a "Black Lives Matter" shirt.

=== National Basketball Association ===
During the 2020 NBA playoffs, players on the Milwaukee Bucks walked out of their August 26 first-round playoff game against the Orlando Magic in protest of the shooting of Jacob Blake. The team decided not to come out of their locker room for the game. It was initially reported the Bucks would forfeit the contest; however, the Magic did not accept the Bucks' forfeiture. The NBA and the National Basketball Players Association announced that in light of the Bucks' decision to refuse to play, all NBA games for the day were postponed. The Toronto Raptors had also discussed a walkout of their second-round playoff series with the Boston Celtics in frustration with a lack of social or legislative change after the murder of George Floyd and as a result of Blake's shooting. In a meeting involving the players that took place later that night, the Los Angeles Lakers and Los Angeles Clippers voted to cancel the rest of the tournament in an informal vote. The other NBA teams voted to continue playing.

Sean Roberts, a Republican member of the Oklahoma House of Representatives, threatened to pull tax breaks for the Oklahoma City Thunder if they knelt. All of the players and coaches from both the Thunder and the opposing Utah Jazz knelt anyway.

The NBA also postponed their scheduled playoff games for August 28. The playoffs resumed on August 29. A "small group of players including" Chris Paul and LeBron James called Barack Obama, who "helped convince" players to finish the season.

=== National Football League ===
In response to the shooting of Jacob Blake, the Detroit Lions canceled their scheduled practice on August 25. On August 27, nine NFL teams canceled their scheduled practices. Nineteen other NFL teams did continue their scheduled practices. Several teams that did not cancel practice issued statements about unity. The Jacksonville Jaguars decided to cancel their scheduled afternoon activities.

=== Major League Baseball ===
In Major League Baseball on August 26, a game between the Milwaukee Brewers and Cincinnati Reds was stopped by striking players. Later that day, the Seattle Mariners–San Diego Padres and the Los Angeles Dodgers–San Francisco Giants games were postponed.

On August 27, seven MLB games were postponed as a result of player strikes. At the New York Mets' Citi Field, a Black Lives Matter shirt was placed on home plate.

On a day that was celebrated as Jackie Robinson Day across MLB, the August 28 game between the Houston Astros and Oakland Athletics was postponed, with both teams walking off the field in protest.

=== National Hockey League ===
The Hockey Diversity Alliance successfully called for the NHL to suspend games following the shooting of Jacob Blake. The NHL postponed their scheduled games for August 27 and 28. These games were part of the 2020 Stanley Cup playoffs.

=== Major League Soccer ===
On August 26, Major League Soccer players staged a walkout of several games to highlight racial injustice. In all, the league canceled five of the six scheduled games for August 26.

=== United Soccer League ===
Memphis 901 FC declined to travel to North Carolina for a scheduled USL Championship game against North Carolina FC on August 29, and the players instead participated in protests in Memphis.

Forward Madison FC, which played its 2020 home games in Milwaukee, postponed a USL League One game scheduled for August 30 against North Texas SC.

=== National Independent Soccer Association ===
On August 27, the New York Cosmos and Detroit City FC announced that their scheduled game for August 29 would be postponed as both teams took part in protests. The following day, New Amsterdam FC and California United Strikers FC both announced they would not travel for their scheduled August 30 matches against Chattanooga FC and Los Angeles Force respectively.

=== Women's National Basketball Association ===
All six games scheduled for August 26 and 27 were postponed.

=== Women's Tennis Association ===
On August 26, Naomi Osaka of the Women's Tennis Association announced she would not play in the Cincinnati Open semifinals as part of the protest following the shooting of Jacob Blake. The Western & Southern Open organizers decided to reschedule matches scheduled for August 27 to the following day. In response, Osaka agreed to play her semifinal match, which she won 6–0, 7–6 (5).

== College athlete walkouts ==
Following the lead of professional athletes, several college football programs including Texas, Oklahoma, Texas Tech, Kentucky, South Florida, Boston College, Western Kentucky, Appalachian State, Mississippi State, Ole Miss and Baylor either canceled practice or staged a walkout on August 27 and 28.

== Reactions to walkouts ==
In an August 27 interview with CNN, Marc Short, Chief of Staff to Vice President Mike Pence, said, "If they want to protest, I don't think we care" when commenting on the NBA walkout in support of social justice reforms after the police shooting of Jacob Blake.

On August 27, retired Chicago Bears linebacker and Hall of Famer Brian Urlacher made a post to Instagram criticizing NBA players for staging walkouts of playoff games over the police shooting of Jacob Blake and stating "Patriot Lives Matter", attracting significant criticism. In response to Urlacher's post, the Chicago Bears stated, "the social media posts in no way reflect the values or opinions of the Chicago Bears organization."

Real Salt Lake and Utah Royals owner Dell Loy Hansen criticized players taking part in the strike and stated that "the disrespect is profound to me personally". He also threatened to pull investment from the club. Hansen announced he would sell the club after further allegations of racist comments and behavior were revealed.

== Variations and disagreements over terminology ==
There has been disagreement over whether to refer to the player action as a strike or a boycott. When a New York Times headline referred to it as a "boycott", Representative Alexandria Ocasio-Cortez of New York responded on Twitter that "strike" was the proper term. LeBron James used the term "boycott" in response to the National Basketball Players Association calling it a "postponement".

== See also ==
- U.S. national anthem protests
- Colin Kaepernick
- Raven Saunders
- 1961 Boston Celtics boycott
- 1968 Olympics Black Power salute
- List of Olympic Games boycotts
- List of boycotts
