= Senator McNutt =

Senator McNutt may refer to:

- Alexander McNutt (governor) (1802–1848), Mississippi State Senate
- Walter McNutt (born 1940), Montana State Senate

== See also ==
- Senator Nutt (disambiguation)
