= Kenosha unrest =

Reaction to the 2020 shooting of Jacob Blake in Wisconsin, U.S.

- Part of the United States racial unrest and reactions to the shooting of Jacob Blake
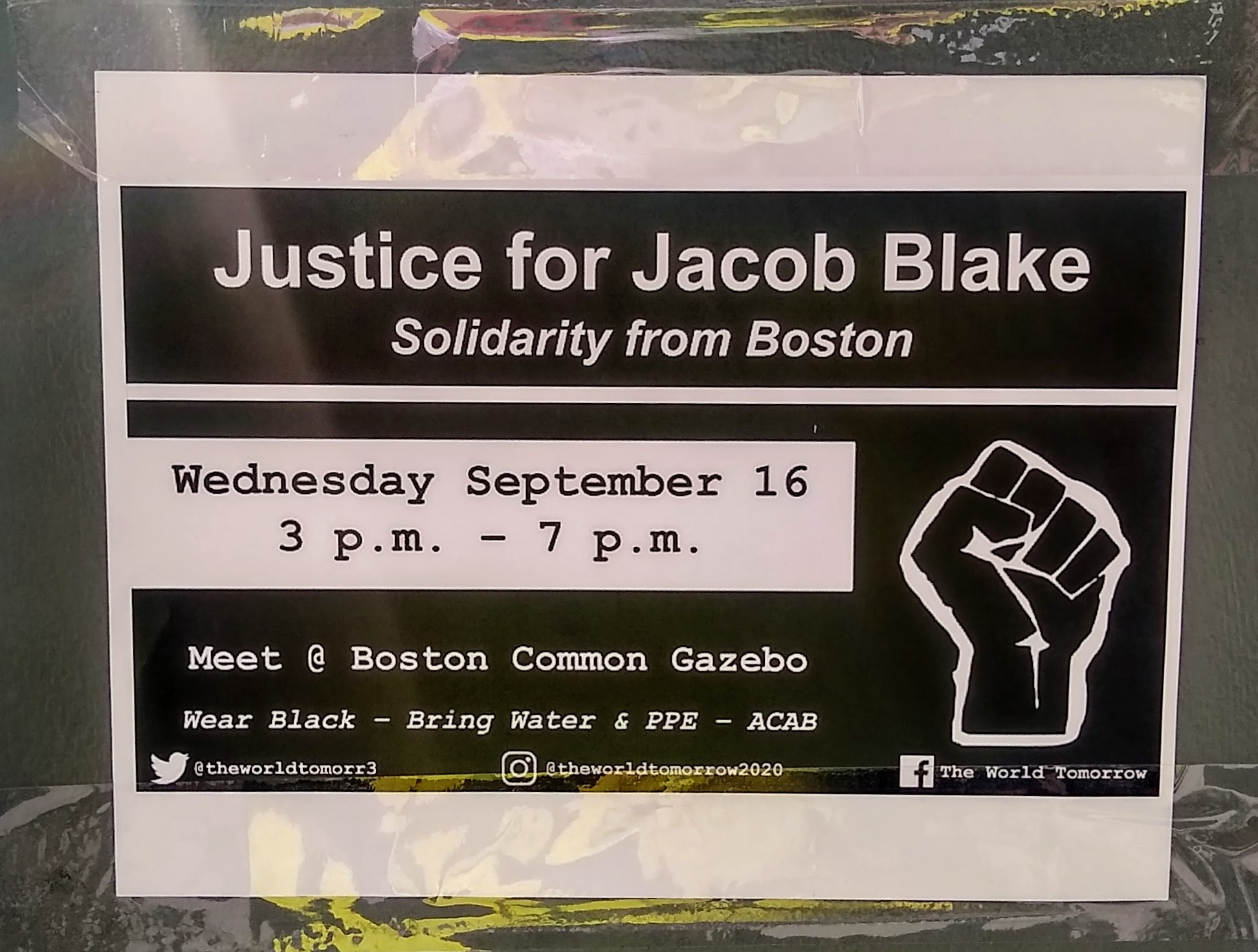
- Justice for Jacob Blake Poster
- Date: August 23 – September 1, 2020 (1 week and 2 days)
- Location: Kenosha, Wisconsin
- Caused by: Shooting of Jacob Blake
- Methods: Protests; demonstrations; civil disobedience; civil resistance; rioting; arson
- Status: State of emergency August 25 – September 2, 2020; and January 4–11, 2021

Parties
Protesters; Black Lives Matter	Federal government of the United States; Wisconsin; Kenosha County; Kenosha Police Department; Wisconsin National Guard; Wisconsin Department of Corrections; Michigan; Michigan National Guard; Arizona; Arizona National Guard; Alabama; Alabama National Guard; Citizen militia organizations; Kenosha Guard

Aftermath
- Deaths: Two protesters shot and killed
- Injuries: 1 protester shot and hospitalized; 1 police officer hospitalized; 1 firefighter hospitalized
- Charged: 1 individual for two counts of first degree murder (found not guilty); 2 individuals initially for illegal firearms possession; 250+ arrests in 2020; 59 more charged in 2021 (Mar)
- Property damage: $2 million to city-owned property Up to $50 million (Kenosha Area Business Alliance estimate)

In the aftermath of the August 2020 police shooting of Jacob Blake, protests, riots, and civil unrest occurred in Kenosha, Wisconsin, as part of the larger United States racial unrest and Black Lives Matter movements. In addition to street protests, marches, and demonstrations, the shooting also led to the 2020 American athlete strikes.

The demonstrations were marked by daily peaceful protesting followed by confrontations with law enforcement, rioting, and arson at night. A state of emergency was declared on August 23, and the National Guard was activated the next day. Further confrontations arose when armed militia members, whom Kenosha County Sheriff David Beth described as "like a group of vigilantes", arrived with the express intent to protect businesses in the city.

On August 25, two protesters were fatally shot and a third was injured by Kyle Rittenhouse, a 17-year-old from Antioch, Illinois. At his November 2021 trial, he argued that he had acted in self-defense and was found not guilty of murder and other charges.

== Background ==
Jacob Blake is an African-American man who was shot seven times during an arrest by police officer Rusten Sheskey in Kenosha on August 23, 2020. Blake was tasered, then shot after he opened the door to an SUV he had been using and reached into the vehicle. In an interview, Blake said that during the scuffle he picked up a "pocket knife" that had fallen from his pants and was trying to put it in his vehicle when he was shot. The officer said he fired when he believed Blake would use the knife to stab him. Blake survived but was paralyzed from the waist down. He was initially handcuffed to his hospital bed and deputies were posted in his room, but the handcuffs and deputies were later removed and a warrant for his arrest was vacated after Blake paid a bond.

== Events in Kenosha ==
=== Protests and riots ===
==== Day 1: August 23 ====
Protests turned violent, and multiple buildings and police vehicles were damaged. A state of emergency was declared in Kenosha County starting at 10:15 p.m., and garbage trucks were used to block 56th Street. Starting at 11:05 p.m., police began using tear gas and rubber bullets in an attempt to disperse crowds. This continued all night. Near midnight, the crowd lit a small fire in front of a ground-floor window of the Kenosha County Courthouse and at least three garbage trucks and a trolley car were set on fire.

By 2:30 a.m., a truck at a used car dealership along Sheridan Road was set on fire. The fire spread to most of the 100 other cars on the lot, damaging an entrance sign for the Bradford Community Church (it did not spread to the church building itself). The buildings surrounding Civic Center Park, along with many downtown businesses, including the post office, Reuther High School, the Kenosha County Administration Building, and the Dinosaur Discovery Museum sustained damage to their front windows and entrance foyers.

Police scanners said that protesters had damaged a Lenco BearCat, and a local newspaper posted a video appearing to show an officer being knocked out with a brick.

==== Day 2: August 24 ====
Mostly peaceful demonstrations were held during the daytime, though they turned violent at night, "with fires, looting, and police using teargas and rubber bullets to disperse crowds".

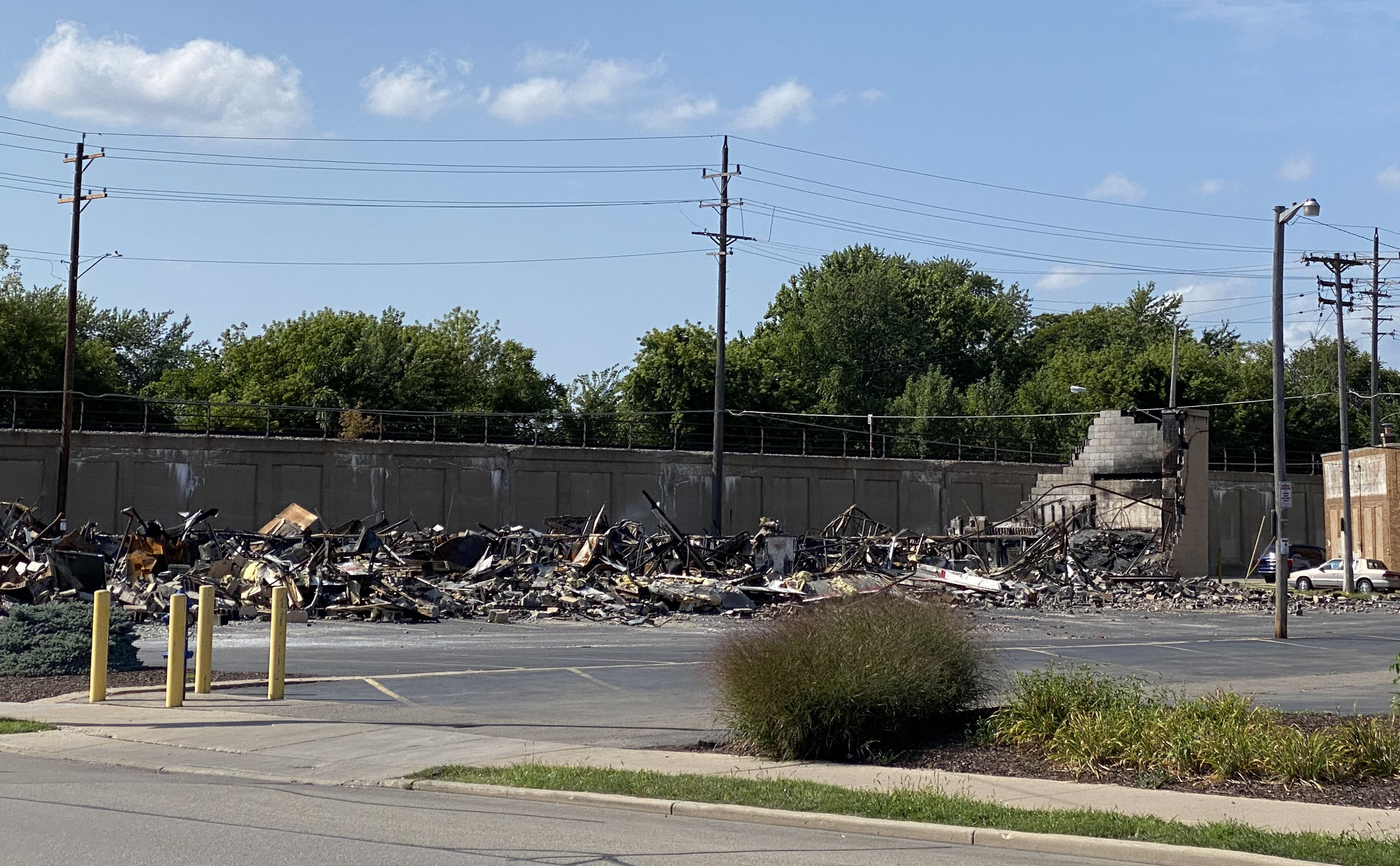
Ruins of the Community Corrections Division building that burned down on August 24, 2020

Wisconsin Governor Tony Evers activated the Wisconsin National Guard to protect firefighters and critical infrastructure in Kenosha. The ACLU of Wisconsin strongly opposed the move. The county announced a curfew that went into effect at 8 p.m. Metra suspended commuter rail service north of Waukegan station. The Kenosha County exits for Interstate 41/94 were closed.

Protesters broke a door off its hinges in an effort to enter the Public Safety Building before being turned back by pepper spray. Teargas was deployed for a second night starting around 8:30 p.m. in an attempt to disperse unlawful crowds gathered near the courthouse, as protesters launched fireworks at police. Another garbage truck was set on fire, while armed gunmen appeared to be guarding a downtown gas station.

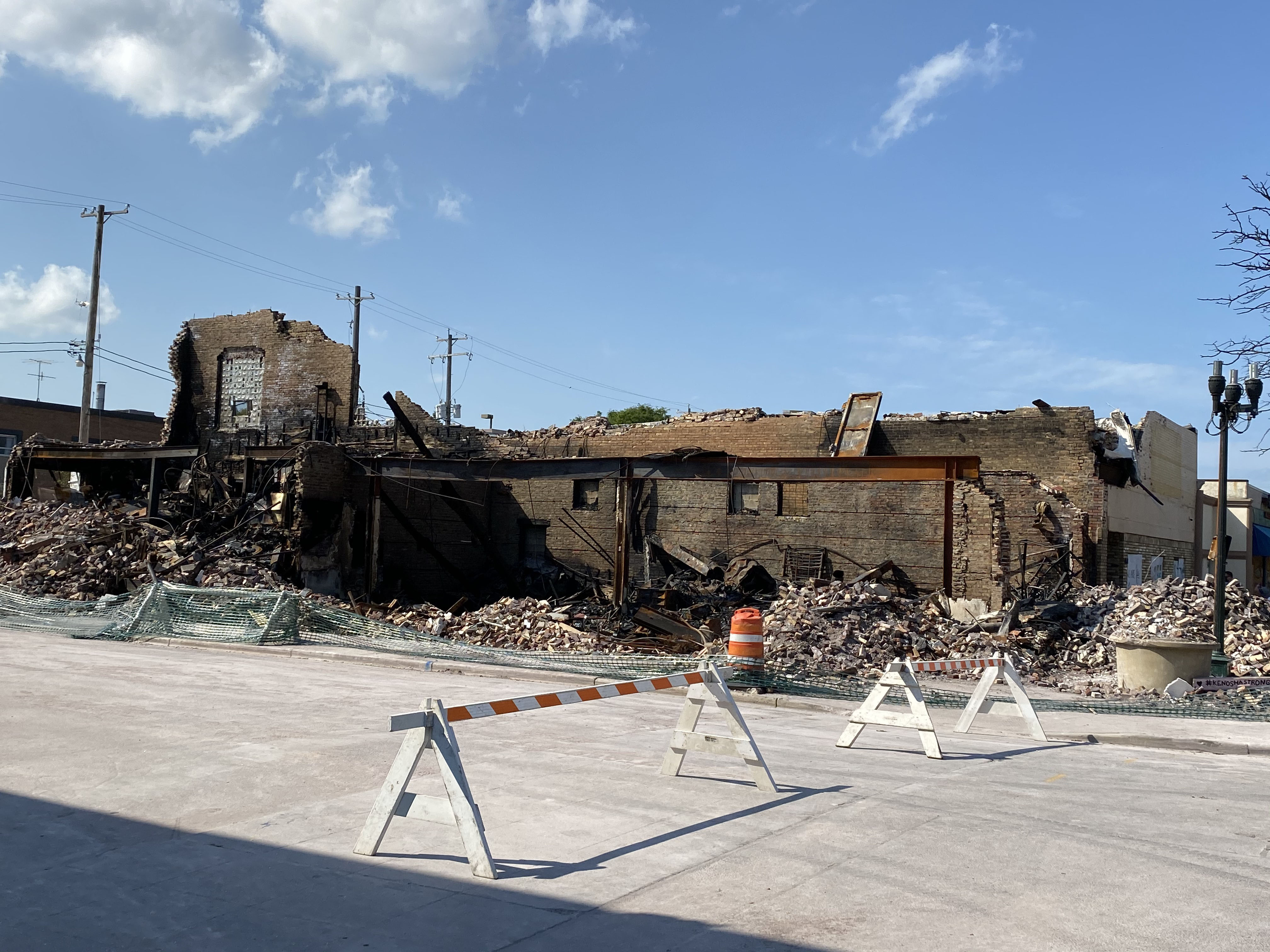
Ruins of the Danish Brotherhood building

Arsonists targeted a Wisconsin Department of Corrections community probation and parole office and the city's Danish Brotherhood Lodge. Other buildings set on fire included a furniture store, residential apartments and several homes. Firefighters worked into the morning of August 25.

The Kenosha Guard, a citizen militia organization with a Facebook group, created an event page named "Armed Citizens to Protect our Lives and Property", and by the next evening the page had over 5,000 users. The Kenosha Guard hosted a gathering for militia members to choose locations in the city to protect. Kenosha County Sheriff David Beth said the militia's presence created confusion and complicated the situation. Facebook removed the group and page on August 26.

==== Day 3: August 25 ====
The Kenosha County Board sent Evers a letter requesting the deployment of 2,000 more national guardsmen. Sheriff Beth said that most of the damage had been done by people with no intent to protest and who were not from Kenosha County. Evers declared a state of emergency for the region and sent 250 Wisconsin National Guard troops to the city.

Law enforcement erected a tall fence to protect the courthouse. Protesters attempted to breach the fence line throughout the night but failed. The Kenosha fire chief said there were 34 active fires and 30 damaged or destroyed businesses. Police said there were arrests associated with looting.

Significant numbers of armed civilians were also on the streets. Police said that such groups had not been invited and were not helpful (Beth called them "a militia... like a vigilante group."), but cellphone footage showed police thanking armed civilians and giving them bottles of water. Beth said the officers were "very wrong" to thank militia members.

At around 11:45 pm, 17-year-old Illinois resident Kyle Rittenhouse shot and killed two people and injured a third. Footage of the first shooting was recorded by Drew Hernandez, and that of the second and third shootings was recorded by Brendan Gutenschwager, an independent video journalist.

==== Day 4: August 26 ====
Protests continued for the fourth straight night, smaller and mostly peaceful. Riot police and National Guard troops did not have a visible presence.

The Kenosha County Board sent Evers a second letter requesting the deployment of 1,500 more national guardsmen. "Our county is under attack", the board wrote. "Our businesses are under attack. Our homes are under attack. Our local law enforcement agencies need additional support to help bring civility back to our community."

=== Later developments ===
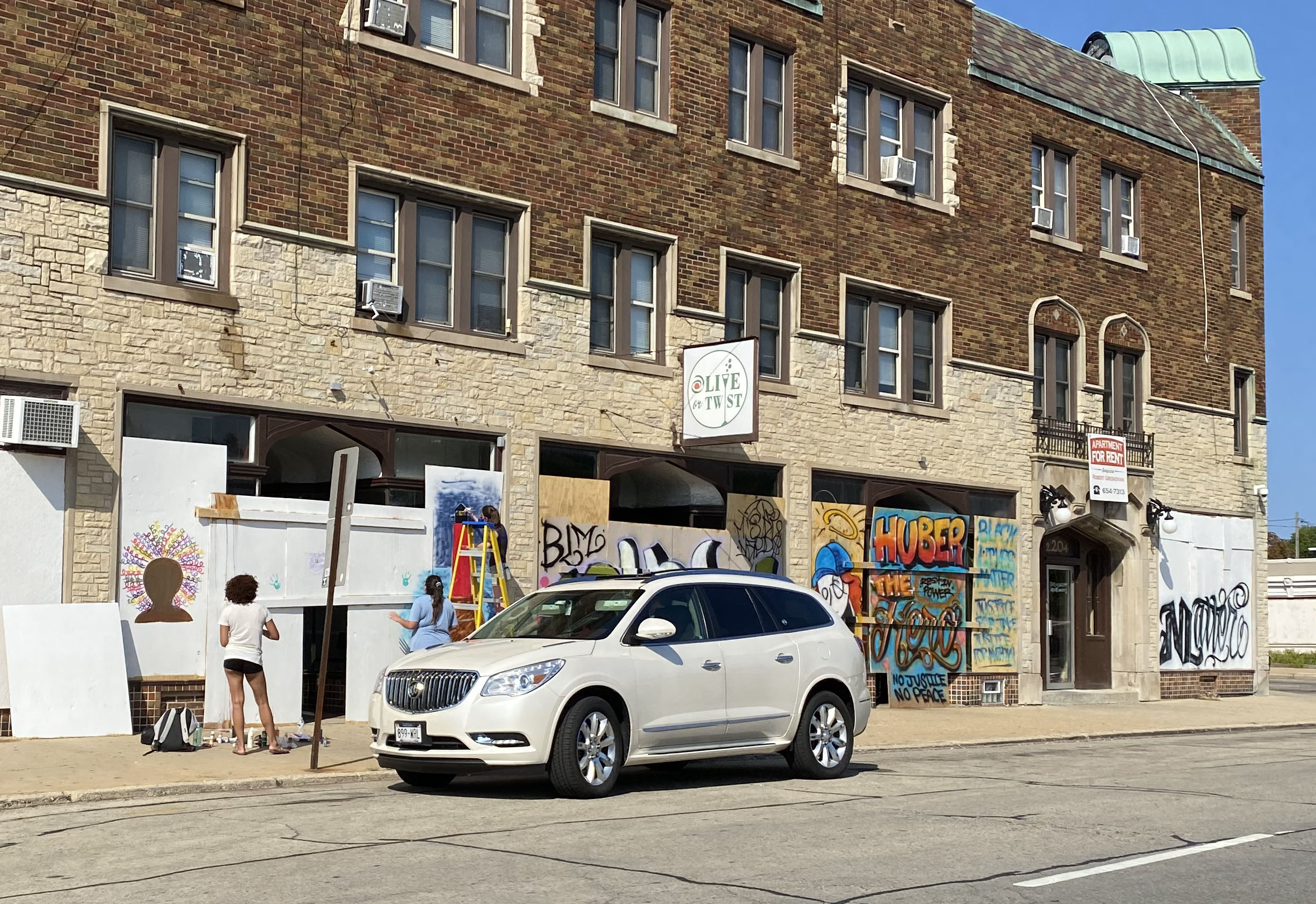
Residents paint a boarded-up building in Kenosha, August 28, 2020

By August 28, the state had deployed nearly 1,000 National Guard troops and more than 200 federal agents. The Michigan National Guard, Arizona National Guard, and Alabama National Guard all sent troops to assist.

Protests continued daily through August 29, when about 1,000 people participated in a march and rally. Speakers included Blake's father, Lieutenant Governor Mandela Barnes, and others who called for police reform legislation. The group marched to the Kenosha Courthouse chanting, "7 bullets, 7 days", "One Person, One Vote", and "No Justice, No Peace".

Two men from Missouri who had traveled to Kenosha and described themselves as militia members were arrested on federal gun charges on September 1. Prosecutors alleged that one of them had told a witness that he was going to Kenosha "with the intention of possibly using the firearms on people". Kenosha County's state of emergency curfew ended on September 2.

In March 2021, the Kenosha Police Department reported that in addition to at least 250 protest-related arrests in 2020, an additional 55 (49 adults and 6 minors) had been charged with connected crimes. Of these, 35 were Kenosha residents. Additional arrests were expected in following months.

==== Visits by political figures ====
President Donald Trump visited Kenosha on September 1, 2020, to see the damage and praise law enforcement. He participated in a discussion, but did not meet with Blake or his family. Evers had written to Trump to ask him to reconsider his visit out of concern that his presence would hinder efforts to "overcome division". Kenosha Mayor John Antaramian and the city's NAACP branch president expressed similar reservations, with Antaramian calling the visit "ill-advised" and the NAACP branch president saying it would "only inflame tensions". But Trump insisted on visiting. Former governor Scott Walker, U.S. Senator Ron Johnson, and seven Kenosha County board members encouraged his visit. During his visit, he met with store owners whose property was damaged during the protests. At least one owner refused to take part in the event. Trump engaged in a round-table discussion on community safety at Mary D. Bradford High School with protesters and supporters lining the streets during his visit.

Democratic presidential nominee Joe Biden visited Kenosha on September 3. The Biden campaign said he had received "overwhelming requests" from local officials to visit, although the local NAACP president and Kenosha County Executive Jim Kreuser opposed it. During this first campaign visit to Wisconsin, Biden met with Blake's family and held a community meeting.

=== Damage assessments ===
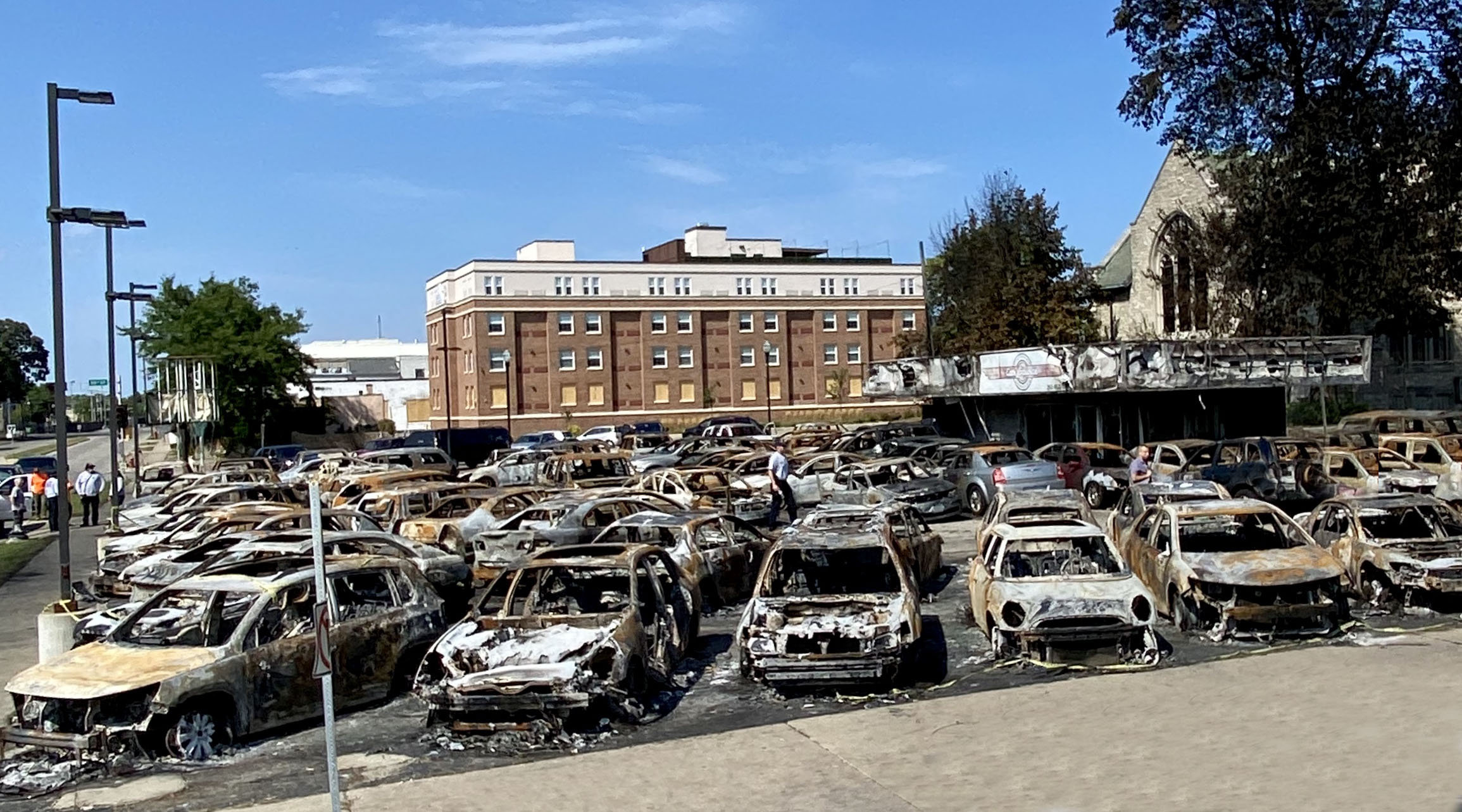
Car Source dealership burned during riots on August 24

City property valued at $2 million was destroyed by rioters, including garbage trucks, street lights and traffic signals. Kenosha's mayor requested $30 million in aid from the state to cover the extensive damage. Damage to private property could be as high as $50 million, according to estimates from the Kenosha Area Business Alliance. This includes the Parole and Corrections office, Danish Brotherhood Lodge, B&L Furniture, and Rodes Camera Store, which were burned down. Overall 40 businesses were shut down and another 100 damaged.

On October 2, 2020, the Bureau of Alcohol, Tobacco, Firearms and Explosives released photos and videos of suspected arsonists, offering up to $5,000 reward for each person identified.

== Fatal shooting ==
On August 25, Kyle Rittenhouse, a 17-year-old from Antioch, Illinois, shot three people with an AR-15 style rifle. Kenosha resident Joseph Rosenbaum, 36, and Silver Lake resident Anthony Huber, 26, were killed; Gaige Grosskreutz, 26, a resident of West Allis, Wisconsin, was injured.

Various people in the vicinity chased Rittenhouse as he ran away after shooting Rosenbaum. Rittenhouse fell and shot two men, Huber and Grosskreutz, as they confronted him, one armed with a handgun. He then walked away with his hands up at times to the police. The police did not arrest him, but he turned himself in to police in Antioch, Illinois, the next morning.

At trial, Rittenhouse was acquitted of all charges.

== Events elsewhere ==
=== Athlete strikes ===
In protest of Blake's shooting, multiple professional athletes refused to play that week. It started on August 26 when the Milwaukee Bucks of the National Basketball Association (NBA) refused to take the court for a playoff game. Members of other NBA teams, the Women's National Basketball Association (WNBA), Major League Baseball (MLB), and Major League Soccer (MLS) all decided not to play their games on August 26. The strikes extended into August 27 and 28 when players from the National Hockey League (NHL) refused to play their playoff games. In response to these events, nine National Football League (NFL) teams canceled their practices scheduled for August 27.

=== Other locales ===
During the Kenosha unrest, there were similar protests and riots in Madison, Atlanta, Minneapolis, New York City, and Philadelphia. In California, there were protests in Los Angeles, Oakland, Sacramento, San Diego, and San Jose. Blake's aunt, Nicole Blake Chafetz of Seattle, encouraged peaceful protest and discouraged the violence and property damage that had occurred during the protests in Seattle. The events in Atlanta, Oakland, and San Diego included violence against police officers, and vandalism and property destruction occurred in Atlanta, Madison, Minneapolis, Oakland, Sacramento, and San Jose, for which related arrests were made.

== District attorney's decision ==
On January 4, 2021, the Kenosha County Sheriff declared a state of emergency and National Guard troops were deployed to Kenosha ahead of the expected announcement of whether criminal charges would be filed against Officer Sheskey. On January 5, Kenosha County District Attorney Michael Graveley announced that no criminal charges would be filed against Sheskey, any other officers, or Blake. A rally for Blake was held on January 4. No violence was reported in the city and Blake's family held a peaceful march on January 11 calling for Sheskey to be fired. That afternoon, the National Guard was pulled out of Kenosha and deployed to Madison due to the onset of the 2021 United States inauguration week protests.

== See also ==
- Killing of Alvin Cole
- Ferguson unrest
- George Floyd protests
- George Floyd protests in Wisconsin
- 2020–2023 United States racial unrest
- List of incidents of civil unrest in the United States
