= Kyle Rittenhouse =

American known for the Kenosha unrest shooting (born 2003)

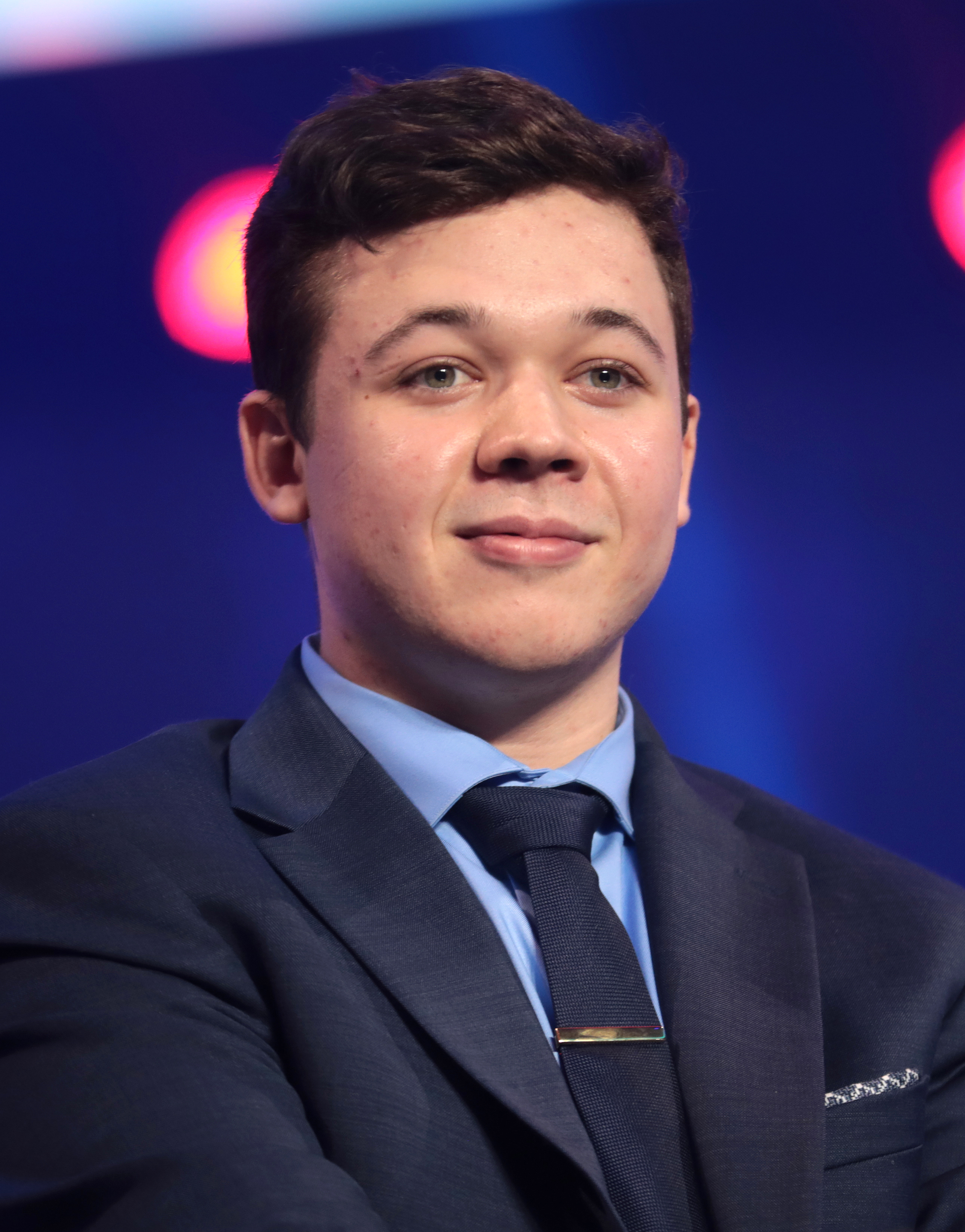
- Rittenhouse in 2021
- Born: Kyle Howard Rittenhouse; January 3, 2003 (age 23); Antioch, Illinois, U.S.
- Known for: Kenosha unrest shooting
- Spouse: Susan Isabella Nelson (m. 2025)

Kyle Howard Rittenhouse (born January 3, 2003) is an American man who gained national attention at age 17 for shooting three men in Kenosha, Wisconsin, two fatally, amid protests and riots in response to the police shooting of Jacob Blake in 2020.

After joining a group of armed individuals who said they were protecting businesses against rioting, a series of confrontations occurred, during which Rittenhouse fatally shot two men who attempted to grab his gun and wounded another who pointed a handgun at him. He was charged with multiple counts, including homicide, by Kenosha County prosectors, but was acquitted in November 2021 after a jury found he acted in self-defense. Two civil lawsuits against him were pending as of February 2023.

Rittenhouse's prosecution attracted widespread media coverage. Following his acquittal, he attended several events hosted by conservative organizations and individuals, including a meeting with President Donald Trump, interviews with political commentator Tucker Carlson, and guest appearances at several Turning Point USA productions. His image was widely circulated and used in political messaging by both supporters and critics, becoming an internet meme and appearing on commercial products. Several proposed laws were named after him, he was offered several internships by Republican politicians, and he appeared in a video game.

Since his trial, Rittenhouse has started a gun rights YouTube channel and raised money for unspecified defamation lawsuits against media companies.

== Early life and education ==
Kyle Howard Rittenhouse was born on January 3, 2003, in Antioch, Illinois, to Michael and Wendy Rittenhouse. His parents were married in Lake County, Illinois, in February 2000, three years before his birth. He has two siblings, an older sister and a younger sister. His parents separated by 2014, when Michael was sued for child support.

As a high school freshman, Rittenhouse participated in the Explorers program at the Grayslake Police Department, as well as a cadet program at the Antioch Fire Department, with the goal of becoming a paramedic or working in law enforcement. Eventually transitioning to online school, he dropped out and left Lakes Community High School altogether in 2018 after attending for one semester in 2017–2018.

Rittenhouse expressed interest in law enforcement through publicly viewable social media posts. In December 2018, he started a fundraiser through Facebook for Humanizing the Badge, a nonprofit. Rittenhouse also expressed support for Blue Lives Matter and the Donald Trump 2020 presidential campaign on various social media platforms, including TikTok and Facebook.

On January 30, 2020, Rittenhouse attended a Trump rally in Des Moines, Iowa, seated in the front row. Rittenhouse attempted to join the US Marine Corps that same month, but he was disqualified from serving by recruiters. He got a part-time job as a lifeguard at the YMCA in Lindenhurst, but he was furloughed in March 2020 when the COVID-19 pandemic began and many public facilities were shut down.

== Kenosha unrest shooting ==
In late August 2020, in the wake of protests against the shooting of Jacob Blake by a police officer, 17-year-old Rittenhouse traveled from Antioch, Illinois to Kenosha, Wisconsin where he joined a group of armed individuals who said they were protecting businesses against rioting. On August 25, 2020, Rittenhouse was armed with an AR-15–style rifle and shot three men during the civil unrest in Kenosha. Photographic evidence reveals that, prior to unrest unfolding, Rittenhouse and others had participated in cleaning graffiti from a high school close to the Kenosha County Courthouse.

After Joseph Rosenbaum chased and cornered Rittenhouse in a dealership parking lot and grabbed the barrel of his rifle, Rittenhouse fatally shot him, soon after Joshua Ziminski had fired a shot nearby. Rittenhouse fled and was pursued by a crowd. He fatally shot a second man, Anthony Huber, who struck Rittenhouse with a skateboard and tried to grab his rifle in a brief struggle. Afterwards, Gaige Grosskreutz approached Rittenhouse and pointed a pistol at him. Rittenhouse shot and wounded Grosskreutz in the right arm. Rittenhouse ultimately walked towards officers with his hands raised, was not contacted by police at the scene, and turned himself in the next day.

=== Criminal trial ===
At a criminal trial in Kenosha in November 2021, prosecutors argued that Rittenhouse was seen as an active shooter and had provoked the other participants. Defense lawyers argued that he had acted in self-defense, stating that he used the force necessary to prevent imminent death or great bodily harm to himself. (Note: In Wisconsin, a defendant asserting perfect self-defense against a charge of first-degree murder must meet an objective threshold showing that the defendant reasonably believed that the defendant was preventing or terminating an unlawful interference with the defendant's person and that the force used was necessary to prevent imminent death or great bodily harm.) Legal experts said that, under Wisconsin law, carrying a gun and any motives for being there would not preclude a self-defense claim, but why the defendant was present would still be a factor in the trial.

A jury weighed two counts of homicide, one count of attempted homicide, and two counts of reckless endangerment, and found Rittenhouse not guilty on all charges. Public sentiment and media coverage of the shootings was polarized and politicized. An Economist/YouGov poll found that two-thirds of Republicans thought Rittenhouse should be acquitted while three-quarters of Democrats thought he should be convicted.

=== Civil litigation ===
Rittenhouse was named as a defendant in two civil lawsuits following the incident.

In August 2021, the family of Anthony Huber filed a federal lawsuit in the Eastern District of Wisconsin against the police and county sheriff's departments in Kenosha. The family added Rittenhouse as a named defendant in January 2022. Despite Rittenhouse's attempts to evade being served, a federal judge ruled in 2023 that the case against him could proceed. In 2024 the judge ordered the Kenosha police department to search computers that may contain pertinent squad car videos.

In February 2023, Gaige Grosskreutz added Rittenhouse as a named defendant to a lawsuit filed in federal court in October 2021. In April 2023, Rittenhouse countersued Grosskreutz.

As of July 2025, the cases by Huber and Grosskreutz had been combined and were still in discovery.

== Media appearances ==
After the acquittal, Rittenhouse was sought for media appearances through July 2022, and attended a number of Republican and conservative events described as a public relations campaign and publicity tour. During the tour, he was represented by publicist Jillian Anderson, a former contestant on season 19 of the reality TV show The Bachelor. A picture of the two released on November 22, 2021, went viral on social media.

=== Tucker Carlson projects ===
A film crew for Tucker Carlson and Fox Nation followed Rittenhouse during the trial for a documentary feature, against the advice of Rittenhouse's attorneys.

Carlson of Fox News held an exclusive interview with Rittenhouse for Tucker Carlson Tonight immediately following his acquittal. Two days later on November 22, 2021, the hour-long episode titled "The Kyle Rittenhouse Interview" released, where Carlson interviewed him about a wide range of subjects. In the interview, Rittenhouse said he would eventually like to become a lawyer or nurse. He also said that he supported the Black Lives Matter movement and "peacefully demonstrating". Carlson introduced Rittenhouse as "bright, decent, sincere, dutiful, and hardworking... exactly the kind of person you would want many more of in your country." The episode was the second-most watched since the show's premiere in 2016, following the episode on the January 6 United States Capitol attack earlier in 2021. It was watched by 4.942 million viewers (up from the show's average of 3.16 million viewers) and had more than four times the viewers of any other network, leading TheWrap to state that the interview "crushed the rest of cable news" on the night it aired. Lorraine Ali of the Los Angeles Times said the interview "canonized" Rittenhouse while categorizing it as an overly sympathetic "soft ball" interview. Rittenhouse and Fox News both denied he was compensated in any way for the interview.

=== Meeting with President Trump ===
President Donald Trump announced on Sean Hannity's show that Rittenhouse had requested a meeting, saying, "He called. He wanted to know if he could come over, say hello, because he was a fan." Rittenhouse, his mother, and Trump met at Mar-a-Lago, the same day the Tucker Carlson Tonight interview aired on November 22, 2021. Trump called him "really a nice young man," and the two were photographed together.

=== Turning Point USA events ===
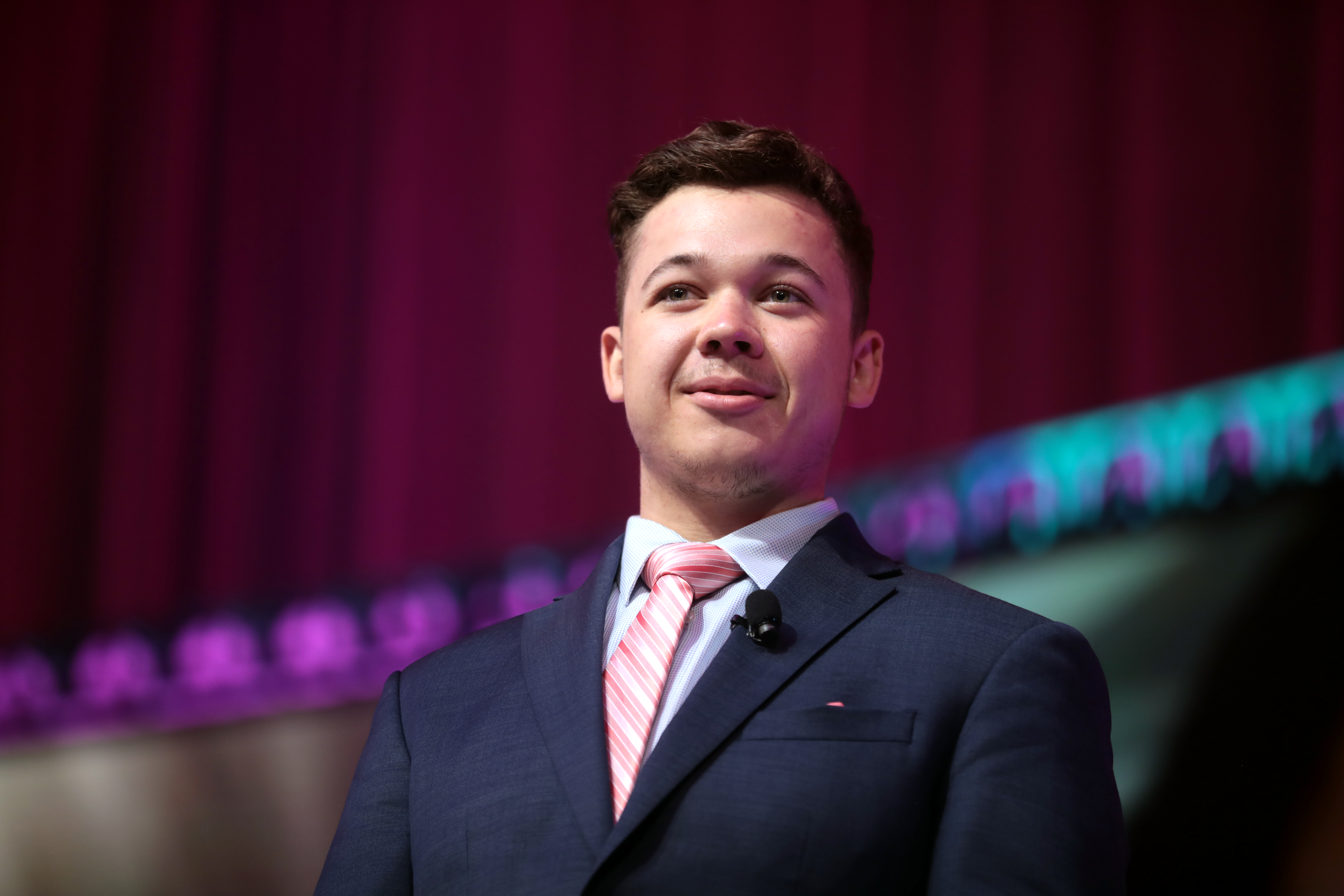
Rittenhouse at a Turning Point USA event in June 2022

Rittenhouse has appeared at several events run by Turning Point USA, a conservative nonprofit organization, including a panel called "Kenosha on Camera" at Turning Point USA's conservative youth conference AmericaFest in December 2021. Held on the third day of the conference on December 20, the panel consisted of Rittenhouse, Charlie Kirk, Jack Posobiec, Elijah Schaffer, and Drew Hernandez. During the panel, Rittenhouse said, "I think my trial was an example of them trying to come after our Second Amendment rights, our right to defend ourselves and trying to take our weapons." Kirk described him as a "hero to millions," and the crowd gave him a standing ovation after chanting his name. The organization arranging the event said Rittenhouse was not compensated for the 45-minute panel appearance.

Rittenhouse also appeared onstage at a Turning Point Young Women's Leadership Summit in 2022, introduced as "the kind of man you should want to be attracted to" who would "protect [his] family" and "stand strong in the face of opposition from culture and evil".

=== Podcasts ===
Rittenhouse has been a guest on several podcasts, including the Blaze Media project You Are Here, hosted by Elijah Schaffer and Sydney Watson, where Rittenhouse said going to protests was "not the best idea." He also appeared on The Jenna Ellis Show, hosted by former Trump staffer Jenna Ellis. On that show, he expressed fear of harassment and said he was afraid to run errands. He denied being a racist, domestic terrorist, or white supremacist, saying he had been attacked by those who described him in these terms. Rittenhouse also said he had reached out to President Joe Biden several times but had not received a response, adding, "He still hasn't replied. So it just shows how much of a man he is to not sit down and talk."

In February 2026 Rittenhouse was the first guest on Steve Gruber's newly-launched podcast Forgotten America, where the discussion covered "media narratives, public scrutiny, and the long-term consequences of becoming a national headline".

== Commercialization and use of his image ==
While campaigning for president in 2020, Biden used images of Rittenhouse in a campaign video he tweeted the day after the September 29 presidential debate. The BBC wrote the video "appeared to link Rittenhouse, without any evidence, to white supremacists." Rittenhouse said using his image and linking him to white supremacy was "actual malice, defaming my character, for him to say something like that." Charles Homans, writing for The New York Times, reported that Rittenhouse was adopted as an informal mascot of the Proud Boys and was photographed surrounded by members of the group after he was released on bond.

Right-wing memes using Rittenhouse's image have spread on social media. In a study of his image being used as a meme on Twitter, the Global Network on Extremism and Technology found thousands of instances of Rittenhouse's face and commentary on his actions shared through a variety of different hashtags. Multiple political figures have shared those memes, including Donald Trump Jr. and Barry Moore. In March 2022, Rittenhouse shared a meme of himself crying while on the witness stand during his trial, edited to appear like he was crying about rising gas prices, which he tweeted was "thanks to a Joe Biden presidency".

Rittenhouse's image has been used for a number of products and sales, including clothing, a gun sale, and a video game. Fans of Rittenhouse have continued to sell clothing with his image following the trial. In 2020, YouTube was criticized for a lack of adequate content moderation – arbitrarily allowing videos depicting Rittenhouse which glorified violence and monetized the killings through links to merchandise – until it was pointed out by a BBC journalist.

The week following Rittenhouse's acquittal, the Saddle River Range gun store in Conroe, Texas, held a "not guilty" sale and the owner posted a photo of Rittenhouse with a gun on their Instagram page.

The same week, speculation on a book deal began. Attorney Andrew M. Stroth, who previously worked as a talent agent, said Rittenhouse could "easily" get a book contract over $1 million. In January 2022, Rittenhouse spokesman David Hancock said Rittenhouse was considering writing a book chronicling his "unorthodox journey into adulthood". He further said the discussions were in the "early phase". In December 2023, Rittenhouse's book Acquitted was released, coauthored with Mark Richards and Michael Quinn Sullivan. Richards was Rittenhouse's lead defense lawyer, and Sullivan was the CEO of former conservative advocacy group Empower Texans.

=== Video games ===
In March 2022, Swedish company Nordic Empire Games launched a video game featuring Rittenhouse called Acquitted. Described as a far-right extremist group owned by William Hahne, the organization created the game that features Rittenhouse shooting his way through crowds of zombies with the choice of 18 different weapons. It was launched through the Steam hosting platform and available for $5. It was not announced if Nordic Empire Games had sought permission to use Rittenhouse's image.

On June 23, 2022, Rittenhouse announced a video game called Kyle Rittenhouse's Turkey Shoot, developed by Mint Studios, to raise money for unspecified future media defamation lawsuits. The video game, which features a cartoon Rittenhouse holding a bright orange gun with the aim of shooting turkeys that represent the media, has no stated release date. In a social media advertisement for the game, Rittenhouse described the media as "nothing but a bunch of turkeys with nothing better to do than to push their lying agenda and destroy innocent people's lives."

== Political internship offers, namesake bills, and politics ==
Rittenhouse was publicly offered congressional internships by several Republican lawmakers following and during his 2021 trial. On November 17, 2021, two days before the verdict, representative Matt Gaetz said he would offer Rittenhouse an internship, followed by representative Paul Gosar. On the day the jury found Rittenhouse not guilty on all charges, Madison Cawthorn offered Rittenhouse an internship as well. Representative Lauren Boebert joked about challenging Cawthorn, who uses a wheelchair, to "a sprint" to employ Rittenhouse as an intern. The offers drew criticism from representative Cori Bush, who called for the lawmakers involved to be expelled from Congress, tweeting, "Not only do these members fuel violence. Now they're actively recruiting someone whose sole qualification is killing people standing up for Black lives and getting away with it."

At least two laws, a bill, and a proclamation have been proposed in different states which have been named after Rittenhouse. In November 2021, U.S. House representative from Georgia Marjorie Taylor Greene introduced the Kyle H. Rittenhouse Congressional Gold Medal Act (H.R.6070) during the 117th United States Congress. The bill, which would award Rittenhouse the Congressional Gold Medal, had no co-sponsors. Taylor Greene said, "Kyle Rittenhouse deserves to be remembered as a hero who defended his community, protected businesses, and acted lawfully in the face of lawlessness. I'm proud to file this legislation to award Kyle Rittenhouse a Congressional Gold Medal."

In November 2021, Oklahoma state Senator Nathan Dahm introduced Senate Bill 1120, called "Kyle's Law". The bill states if a defendant is charged with murder, but is found not guilty due to justifiable homicide, the state must reimburse them. A modified version of the bill passed out of the Senate Judiciary Committee with a majority Republican party-line 7–3 vote in February 2022.

In January 2022, Tennessee State Representative Bruce Griffey introduced HB1769, also known as "Kyle's Law". The Hill said the law "would require the state to reimburse defendants found not guilty of homicide charges due to self-defense." Griffey additionally proposed a proclamation be created in honor of Rittenhouse, saying he "deserves to be recognized as a hero."

In November 2022, Rittenhouse met with Republican House of Representative members of the Second Amendment Caucus to discuss his experiences and answer questions from the caucus. The meeting was held at the Conservative Partnership Institute in Washington D.C. Caucus members who were present included Reps. Lauren Boebert (R-CO), Thomas Massie (R-KY), Andrew Clyde (R-GA) and Byron Donalds (R-FL). Rittenhouse said, "I'm 19 and just got to speak with leaders of the greatest country on earth! This was an amazing evening where I got to share my story and discuss the importance of the Second Amendment. Even while the radical left continues to sue me and disparage my name, I know these great leaders have my back."

In January 2023, a Texas brewery cancelled an anti-censorship rally it was to host featuring Rittenhouse, citing concerns by local patrons and a conflict with its own values. In response, Rittenhouse accused the brewery of censoring him.

After moving to Texas, Rittenhouse became involved with Texas politics, appearing at political rallies and endorsing candidates. Rittenhouse has been working with former Texas House representative and Republican donor Jonathan Stickland.

In October 2024, after it became known that Rittenhouse planned to appear later that month at a charity music festival in Orlando, several bands pulled out of the event, including Evergreen Terrace, who referred to him as a "murderer". Organizers of the Shell Shock II festival, which supports first responders dealing with injuries such as PTSD, upheld Rittenhouse's participation, saying in part that "everyone is welcome".

=== Gun advocacy ===
Rittenhouse has become a gun rights advocate since his trial. In August 2023, he formed the Rittenhouse Foundation, a Texas-based non-profit with a stated purpose to protect legal rights. The organization's filing includes wording from the Second Amendment. Chris McNutt, president of Texas Gun Rights, is also a director of the foundation.

In March 2024, Rittenhouse rushed off a University of Memphis stage after being confronted with protests and politically themed questions. He returned to the university in late February 2025 and spoke without interruptions to about 40 people, taking some questions afterward while protestors were gathered outside. Both speaking events were sponsored by Turning Point USA.

In June 2024, Rittenhouse was named outreach director for Texas Gun Rights, a state affiliate of the National Association for Gun Rights.

== Media projects ==
=== Media Accountability Project ===
In February 2022, Rittenhouse announced he was launching the Media Accountability Project, sometimes referred to by its acronym TMAP, during another interview on Tucker Carlson Tonight, saying:

Me and my team have decided to launch The Media Accountability Project as a tool to help fundraise and hold the media accountable for the lies they said and deal with them in court. I don't want to see anybody else have to deal with what I went through. So I want to hold them accountable for what they did to me, because I don't want to see anybody have to go through what I went through.

Rittenhouse's announcement drew a comparison by The Tennessee Star to Nicholas Sandmann, a Covington Catholic High School student from Kentucky who became known for the January 2019 Lincoln Memorial confrontation.

In 2022, a satirical story turned into a rumor circulating on social media saying that Rittenhouse had filed and settled a lawsuit against Whoopi Goldberg and The View. The story was false.

=== YouTube channel ===
Rittenhouse launched a YouTube channel focusing on guns and the Second Amendment on October 16, 2022. His first video on the channel showed him firing a handgun and an automatic rifle and included the YouTube gun advocate Brandon Herrera as a guest. The video has since been deleted, and the channel appears to have become dormant with no new videos uploaded.

== Personal life ==
In 2022, after being acquitted of the Kenosha shootings, Rittenhouse moved to Texas.

On December 10, 2025, Rittenhouse announced via social media posts that he married Bella Nelson. The wedding reportedly took place in June 2025.

=== Educational aspirations ===
In October 2021, Rittenhouse started taking online classes at Arizona State University as a non-degree seeking student, and wanted to transition to in-person classes. Non-degree seeking students at ASU go through a "modified admissions process" instead of the full admissions process for degree-seeking students. ASU students held a rally called "Killer off campus" to protest Rittenhouse's enrollment. Multiple student groups organized the rally, including Students for Justice in Palestine, Students for Socialism, ASU's MEChA chapter, and the Multicultural Solidarity Coalition. By the next month, he had withdrawn. ASU has stated that even if Rittenhouse had been found guilty, that would not have affected his enrollment since it is not ASU's policy to consider criminal records of applicants or students, and he could have continued even if in prison.

In a June 2022 appearance on The Charlie Kirk Show, Rittenhouse said he would be attending Texas A&M University in College Station, Texas; a spokesperson from the university denied he had been accepted. After that announcement, Rittenhouse posted on Twitter that he would be attending Blinn College, a junior college and what he referred to as a "feeder school" for Texas A&M. A Blinn College spokesperson confirmed Rittenhouse had applied, but had "not enrolled for a current or upcoming term".
