= MacNutt (surname) =

MacNutt is a surname. Notable people with the surname include:

- D. Scott MacNutt (1935–2010), Canadian politician
- Derrick Somerset Macnutt (1902–1971), British crossword compiler
- Francis MacNutt (1925–2020), American Roman Catholic priest
- Francis Augustus MacNutt (1863–1927), American diplomat and Catholic writer
- Frederick MacNutt (1873–1949), British Anglican priest and author
- George Taylor MacNutt (1865–1937), Canadian politician
- Peter MacNutt (1834–1919), Canadian merchant and politician
- Thomas MacNutt (1850–1927), Canadian politician
- Thomas Russell MacNutt (1895–1973), Canadian politician
- Walter MacNutt (1910–1996), Canadian organist, choir director, and composer

== See also ==
- McNutt, surname
