= Killing of Alvin Cole =

2020 police killing of a black teenager

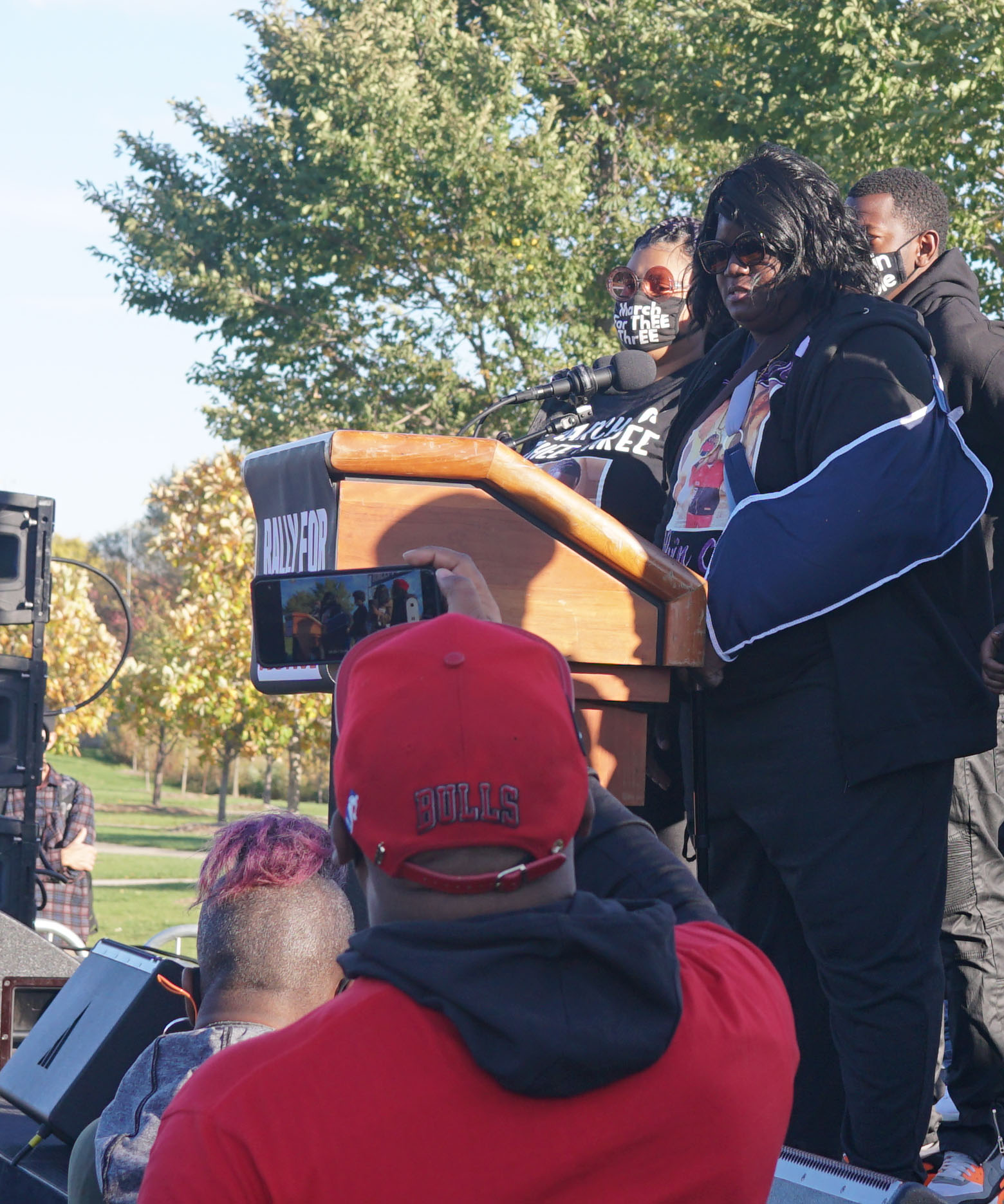
- Tracey Cole speaks at a rally for her son on October 15, 2020, in Wauwatosa's Hart Park.
- Date: February 2, 2020; 6 years ago
- Location: Wauwatosa, Wisconsin, U.S.
- Type: Police killing by shooting
- Participants: Joseph Mensah (shooter)
- Deaths: Alvin Cole
- Charges: None

On the evening of February 2, 2020, Alvin Cole, a 17-year-old black male, was fatally shot by a Wauwatosa, Wisconsin black male police officer Joseph Mensah, outside Mayfair Mall in Wauwatosa. The shooting occurred after Cole refused a command from the police to drop the stolen gun he was holding and Cole fired a bullet as he tried to flee. Two shots were fired when Cole was on his hands and knees, and the remaining three shots were fired by Mensah while Cole was face down on the ground. Mensah was the only officer among the five other officers at the scene who fired his weapon.

The demonstrations played out against a backdrop of protests worldwide over the murder of George Floyd.

== Killing ==
Black Wauwatosa officer Joseph Mensah shot 17-year-old Cole outside Mayfair Mall on February 2, 2020, after police responded to a call of a reported disturbance at the shopping center. Police said Cole fled from the scene carrying a stolen 9 mm handgun. They cited squad car audio evidence, along with testimony from Mensah and two police officers, that Cole had fired a shot at the police while fleeing and refused commands from the officers to drop the gun. It was determined that Mensah fired his weapon five times.

Cole was the third person Mensah had fatally shot in the five years since he became a police officer, and his death sparked protests in Wauwatosa. Mensah is the only officer who has shot and killed anyone since 2010 in Wauwatosa, Wisconsin. The teenager's death sparked protests throughout the summer in Wauwatosa, Wisconsin, a city located west of Milwaukee.

Cole's family is being represented by the prominent attorney Kimberley Motley. Motley is also representing the families of the two other men shot and killed by Mensah: 25-year-old Jay Anderson Jr. on June 23, 2016; and 29-year-old Antonio Gonzales on July 16, 2015. The lawsuits were consolidated in September 2022, but a judge dismissed the claims related to Anderson and Gonzales on March 14, 2024.

=== Video ===
There is video of the shooting. Police videos and video evidence from the nearby businesses seem to show police shouting "drop the gun," before shots are fired.

== Reactions ==
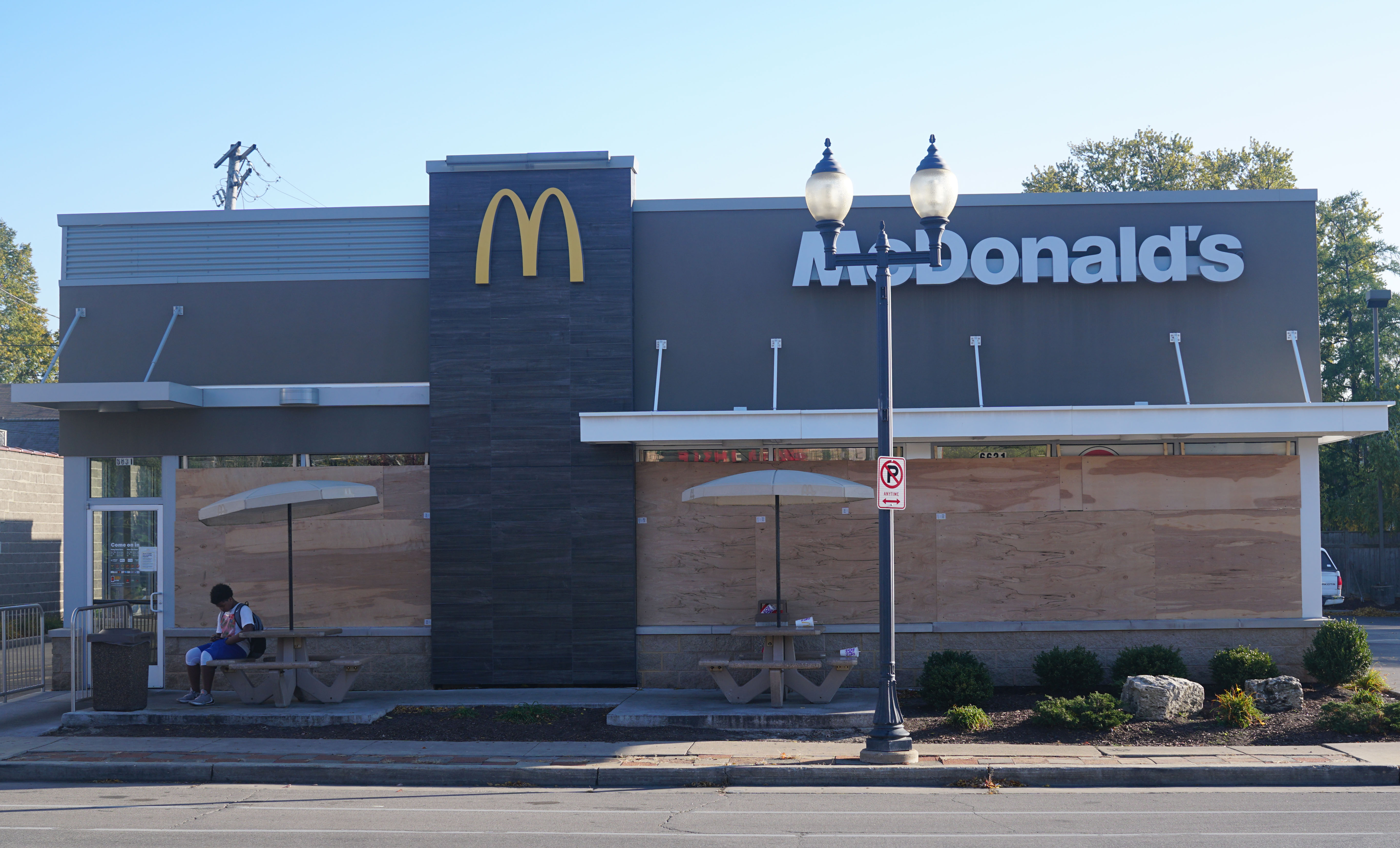
A McDonalds on North Avenue in Wauwatosa is boarded up to protect windows.

On October 7, 2020 Milwaukee County District Attorney John T. Chisholm announced that Officer Mensah would not be charged because he had reasonable belief that deadly force was necessary. Governor Tony Evers announced earlier on October 7 that he had activated Wisconsin National Guard members as a precaution, which were later confirmed to be "hundreds" of troops. The Wauwatosa police chief announced on social media that his police department agreed with the decision not to charge Officer Joseph Mensah with a crime.

Also on October 7, 2020, an independent investigator, Steven M. Biskupic, a former federal prosecutor, released an 81-page report that stated officer Mensah should be fired. One of the reasons the report recommended termination: the investigator concluded that Mensah made less than truthful statements. The report went on to say that keeping Mensah on as a police officer would be "an extraordinary, unwarranted and unnecessary risk".

== Subsequent protests ==
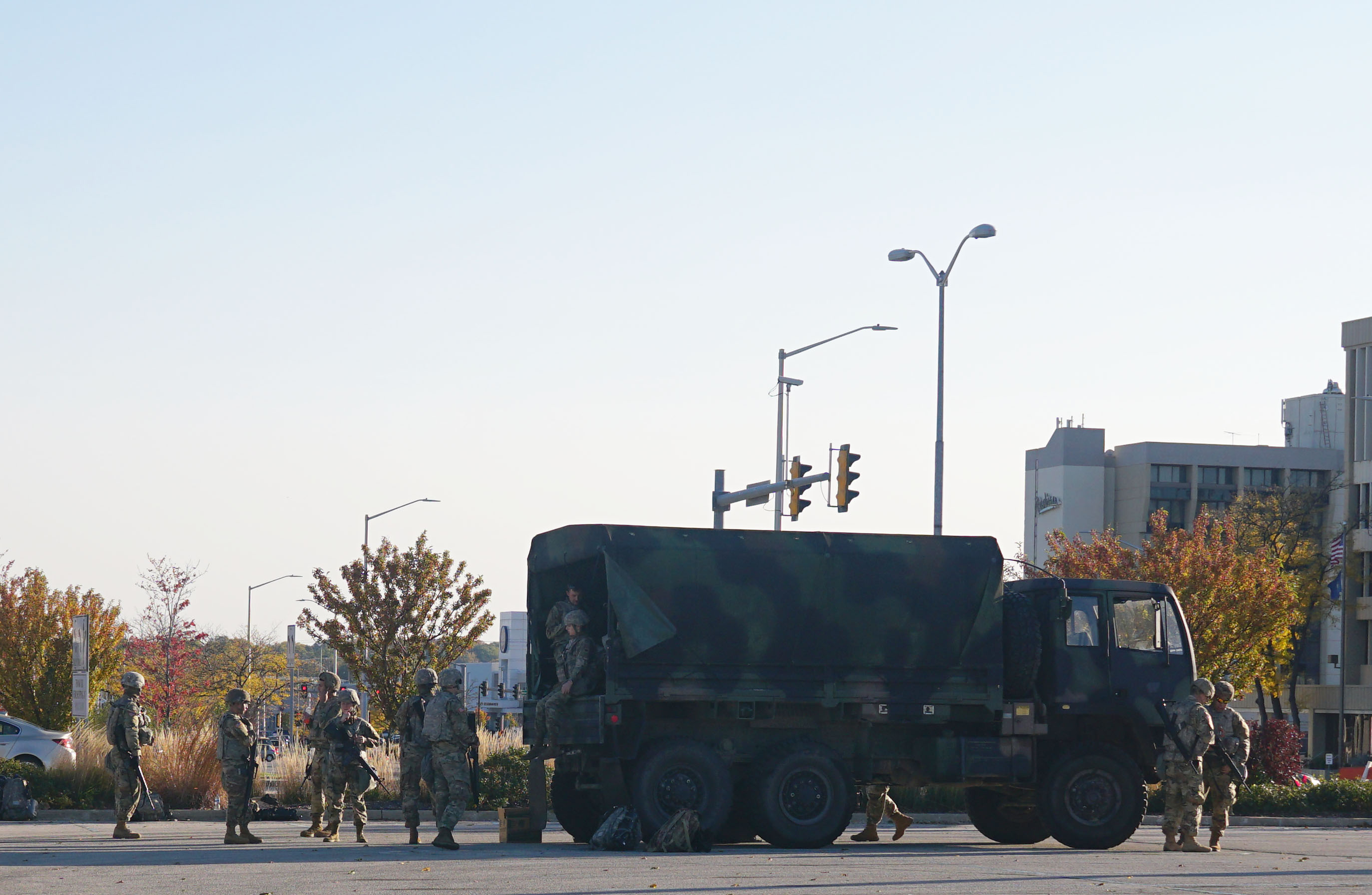
National Guard Troops staging at the Alvin Cole shooting site – Mayfair Mall

Protests occurred in the time after the announcement that Officer Mensah would not be charged. The Wauwatosa Police Department and Wisconsin National Guard have been the main agencies present at each protest since October 7, 2020.

The city of Wauwatosa issued a nightly 7:00 p.m. curfew on October 7. Some people ignored the curfew and started marching peacefully in the city. Later that evening and past the curfew, a group of protesters confronted a police line. Police said some people were throwing rocks at law enforcement and buildings and that they used tear gas to disperse the protesters. Local media reported windows were broken at several businesses on the city's north side, including a pharmacy, coffee shop, wall coverings store, cleaners and fitness centre.

In additional protests on October 8, among the most prominent people arrested were 17-year-old Alvin Cole's mother, Tracy Cole and his three sisters who claimed that they were assaulted and arrested by police according to Attorney Kimberley Motley, who is representing the family. Mrs. Cole and her daughter were taken to the hospital and 24 people were arrested for peacefully protesting, according to police. Police and the National Guard were both actively working to patrol the city. On October 10, Rapper/entertainer Jay-Z and his company Team ROC, offered to pay fines for those arrested during the Wauwatosa protests. The rapper also called for the termination of Officer Mensah. The rapper posted bond for several protesters including the mother of Alvin Cole, Tracy.

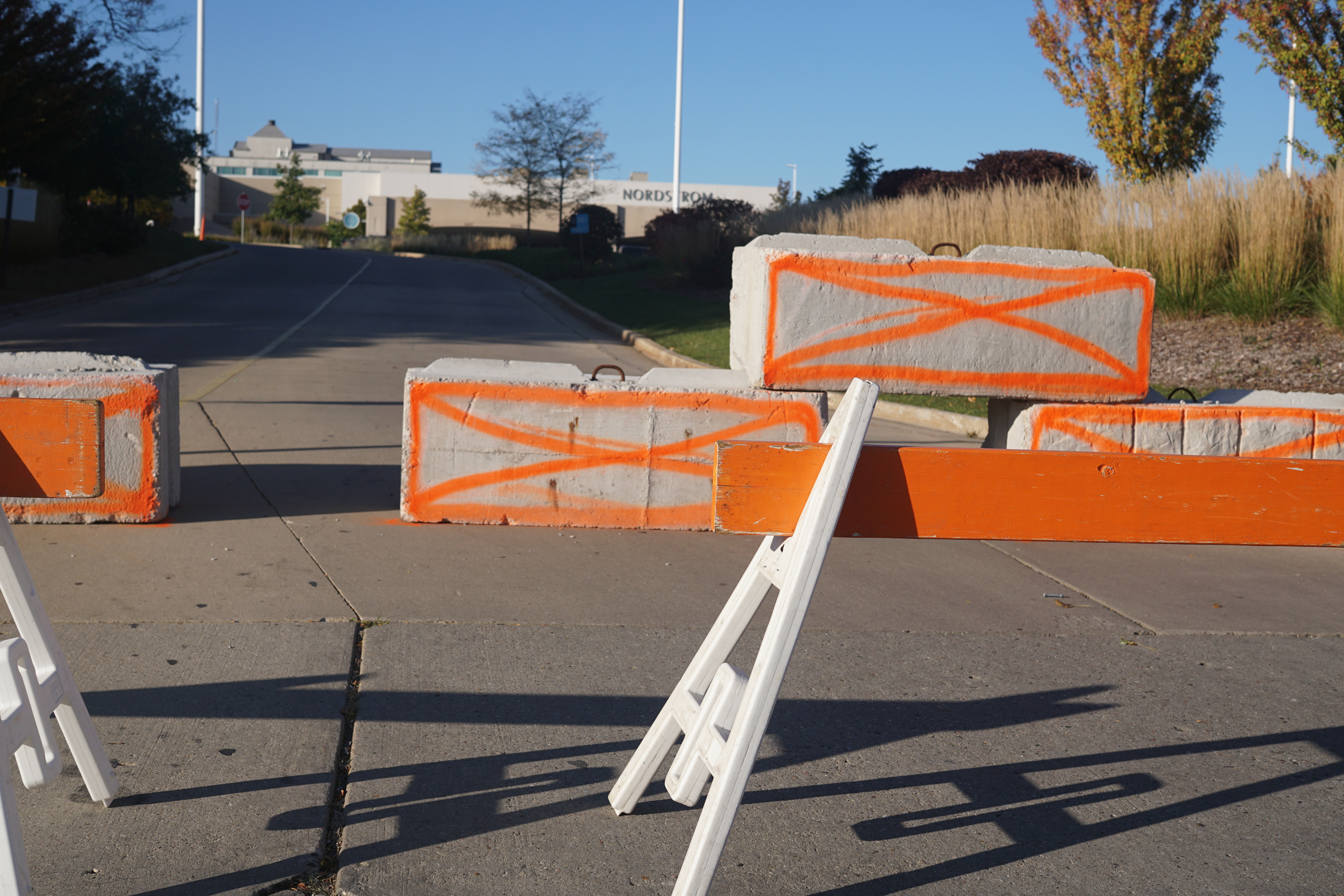
A parking lot entrance is blocked with concrete barriers at Mayfair Mall.

In a further escalation of protests on October 9, 28 protesters were arrested in a third night of clashes between police and protesters. Police deployed tear gas to stop peaceful protestors. Two arrests were on felony charges, one was a misdemeanor arrest, and 25 were municipal arrests.

An unspecified number of protesters were arrested in the fourth night of demonstrations, October 10, after the usual 7:00 p.m. curfew began. According to police, protesters occupied the Wauwatosa City Hall lawn and blocked traffic on the fourth night of demonstrations. The protests began in Washington Park where demonstrators marched to City Hall where a group of hundreds had assembled to protest. The crowd dispersed at 8 pm when National Guard troops police warned the protestors that they were violating the 7:00 pm curfew. The Wauwatosa Police Department released a statement describing incidents from the fourth night of protests and stating that no property damage was reported.

On October 11, at 5:30 pm protestors gathered near 69th and North Avenue in Wauwatosa. The police arrived at 7:00 pm and told the crowd to disperse. Several protestors refused to leave and were arrested. The curfew expired on October 12.

== Subsequent civil trials and settlement ==
On March 20, 2025, a federal excessive-force lawsuit's civil trial against Mensah for Cole's death ended in a mistrial after an eight-person jury could not reach a unanimous verdict. On September 11, 2025, a second such trial against Mensah over Cole's death ended as a mistrial due to a hung jury. The same day of this second jury deadlock, presiding Judge Lynn Adelman scheduled a third civil trial against Mensah for Cole's death, to start on May 4, 2026. Two additional federal lawsuits were filed against Mensah over the 2015 and 2016 deaths of Antonio Gonzalez and Jay Anderson Jr. All three lawsuits against Mensah were filed in 2021 and 2022 – each alleging that he used excessive force and that the Wauwatosa Police Department promoted racism – and were consolidated in September 2022. As of September 2025, however, Adelman had dismissed the claims against Mensah for the deaths of Gonzalez and Anderson, while allowing the lawsuit against him for the death of Cole to continue. On April 28, 2026, a third civil trial against Mensah over Cole's death was avoided, with Cole's family finalizing an agreed settlement.

== See also ==
- 2020–2023 United States racial unrest
- George Floyd protests
- George Floyd protests in Wisconsin
- Kenosha unrest
