= Chris McNutt =

American gun rights advocate

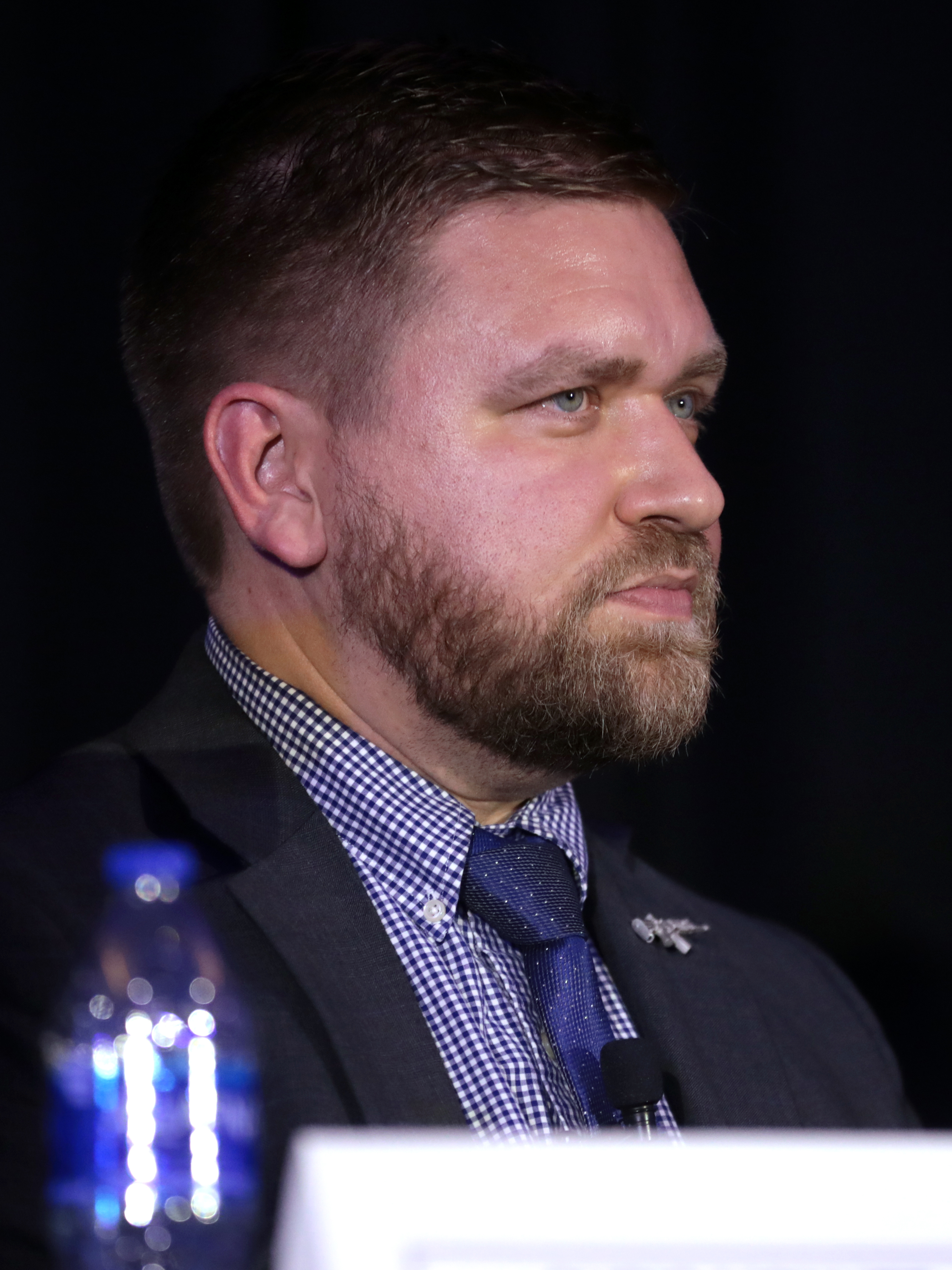
- McNutt in 2021
- Born: 1986 (age 39–40)
- Education: Bachelor's degree
- Alma mater: University of North Texas at Dallas
- Occupation: President for Texas Gun Rights
- Known for: Gun rights activism
- Title: President
- Political party: Republican

Chris McNutt (born 1986) is an American conservative activist and gun rights supporter who has advocated for "permitless carry" legislation, also known as "Constitutional Carry." He is the president of Texas Gun Rights, a state affiliate of the National Association for Gun Rights.

== Political Career Highlights & Controversies ==
=== Forced Reset Trigger Settlement ===
In May 2025, McNutt signed a landmark federal settlement on behalf of Texas Gun Rights resolving multiple lawsuits over the ATF's classification of Forced Reset Triggers (FRTs) as machine guns in NAGR v Garland. The lawsuit was brought by TXGR, NAGR, Rare Breed Triggers, and several individual plaintiffs. The settlement required the Department of Justice and ATF to:

- Drop all ongoing lawsuits involving FRTs,
- Return all seized or surrendered devices, and
- Cease enforcement against lawful FRTs as defined by a prior court ruling in NAGR v. Garland (2024).

McNutt called the victory “a direct result of refusing to compromise” and said it “proves that when gun owners stand their ground against the deep state, we win.”

=== Kyle Rittenhouse ===
During the 2023 Texas legislative session, McNutt joined with Kyle Rittenhouse to oppose a bill that would raise the age to purchase an assault rifle in the state of Texas, calling it "a perfect example of a knee jerk ‘just do something’ mentality." After the session ended, McNutt joined Kyle's "Rittenhouse Foundation", a non-profit formed to combat gun control, as a member of the board of directors.

During the summer of 2024, McNutt further solidified his relationship with Rittenhouse by hiring him as Outreach Director for Texas Gun Rights. “Kyle’s unwavering dedication to the Second Amendment and his firsthand experience with the legal and cultural battles surrounding gun rights make him an invaluable addition to our team" McNutt stated.

In August 2024, McNutt endorsed Donald Trump's candidacy for President on behalf of Texas Gun Rights. The endorsement followed public backlash after Rittenhouse briefly criticized Trump’s record on gun rights during a video endorsing former Congressman Ron Paul. McNutt affirmed the organization's position, stating, "Trump is the only choice for President."

=== Constitutional Carry ===
The McNutt-led Texas Gun Rights was at the forefront of the movement to make Texas a permitless carry state, also known as "Constitutional Carry," which led to McNutt appearing on the November 5, 2018, cover of Time magazine's "Guns in America" issue as then executive director of Texas Gun Rights. In 2021, McNutt delivered over 118,000 petitions in support of permitless carry to the Texas House of Representatives and testified in support of it during a hearing in the Texas House Homeland Security and Public Safety Committee. Texas GOP Chairman Lieutenant Colonel Allen West later partnered with McNutt and his organization to pressure Lieutenant Governor Dan Patrick and the Texas Senate to pass Constitutional Carry House Bill 1927. Abbott said he would sign the bill if it reached his desk. After the bill passed through both chambers of the legislature, McNutt claimed the Governor removed him from the signing ceremony before signing it into law.

=== Feud With Texas Speaker Dennis Bonnen ===
During the 2019 legislative session, Speaker of the Texas House of Representatives Dennis Bonnen accused McNutt of threatening behavior after McNutt, while leafleting Bonnen's neighborhood in support of permitless carry legislation, showed up at his home. Bonnen says that McNutt's actions were the reason he declared McNutt's bill dead.

Bonnen and McNutt had a confrontation at a subsequent Republican Party fundraiser dinner where the Speaker claimed he was "set up." McNutt demanded an apology from Bonnen and also claimed that he had lied about their interactions during a press conference about the incidents. McNutt described his interaction as “nothing short of professional” during the press conference, when DPS bodycam footage was presented corroborating McNutt's telling of the incident. The officer involved stated in his written report of the incident, “McNutt did not make any threatening statements towards Representative Bonnen or his people.”

=== Dennis Bonnen's Resignation ===
The controversy between Chris McNutt and Dennis Bonnen was credited as the reason Empower Texans president Michael Quinn Sullivan secretly recorded a meeting with Bonnen, which was described by Texas Monthly as "the most significant political scandal in Texas politics in many years". In the recording, Bonnen offered Empower Texans press credentials that would allow them on the floor of the Texas House during the 2021 legislative session. In exchange, Bonnen wanted Empower Texans to target certain Republican representatives in the next primary election for defeat while not criticizing certain other Republicans. After Sullivan released a tape of the meeting, Bonnen announced he would not seek re-election.

"I recorded the meeting not to capture the “locker room” talk or gossip that is typical of meetings in the Austin swamp, but to ensure Bonnen could not lie about the meeting or distort its purpose in the future. I had in mind the lies he told (publicly and without any consequence so far) about Chris McNutt of Texas Gun Rights, and I have heard stories of him doing the same to others, so I wasn’t going to let him do it to me" Michael Quinn Sullivan stated when he released the recording in October 2019.

=== US Senator John Cornyn ===
McNutt spoke out against U.S. Senator John Cornyn's support for red flag laws during the 2022 Republican Party of Texas state convention, where Cornyn referred to party delegates as a "mob" for opposing his support of the policy.

McNutt publicly opposed Cornyn’s bid for Senate Majority Leader following the 2024 elections. McNutt stated that “John Cornyn is not just the wrong choice; he's the worst choice,” citing Cornyn’s support for the Bipartisan Safer Communities Act (BSCA) and red flag law incentives as reasons he was unfit for the position. Gun rights advocates, including McNutt, argued that Cornyn’s record on firearms legislation contributed to his defeat in the Republican caucus vote.

== Other Political Activity ==
=== 2018 ===
During the 2018 primary elections, McNutt's group was accused of attacking then-candidate for Texas State Senate Angela Paxton, wife of Texas Attorney General Ken Paxton, shortly after an affiliate of its parent organization received a $150,000 donation from the campaign account of Senator Don Huffines. Huffines' twin brother, Phil Huffines, was Paxton's opponent. Paxton defeated Huffines with 54.4% of the vote and went on to become the next state senator for Texas Senate, District 8.

McNutt's activism also extended to the city of Richardson in 2018, where he and his wife created the "Vote NO 4 RISD TRE PAC" to oppose the Richardson Independent School District's tax ratification election. The 12.5% property tax increase passed with 53% of the vote with record turnout.

=== 2019 ===
Following the 2019 Texas legislative session, McNutt asked Governor Abbott to use his line-item veto to remove funding for a Department of Public Safety gun storage program. According to a statement from Texas Gun Rights, "Speaker Dennis Bonnen slipped a $1 million spending spree for the promotion of 'safe gun storage' into the states budget bill."

=== 2020 ===
In 2020, McNutt testified to the Alabama Senate Judiciary Committee in favor of a bill to repeal the Alabama permit requirement for the concealed carrying of pistols. The bill ultimately stalled after failing to gain traction in the Republican-controlled legislature. McNutt and his Texas Gun Rights faced off with the National Rifle Association of America (NRA) in the 2020 primary election when TXGR-backed candidate Bryan Slaton forced NRA-backed incumbent Dan Flynn into a runoff. Slaton went on to defeat Flynn with over 61% of the vote.

=== 2023 ===
In October 2023, Texas Gun Rights was granted a preliminary injunction in their lawsuit against the Bureau of Alcohol, Tobacco, Firearms, and Explosives, TGR v ATF, for their ban on pistol stabilizing braces, protecting its members from enforcement of the ban. McNutt declared "The fight is not over, but this victory today is an incredible step forward." Within days of that injunction, TGR secured a second preliminary injunction in NAGR v Garland, which dealt with a 2021 decision of the ATF to classify guns equipped with forced reset triggers as machine guns. McNutt proclaimed "Our injunction against the ATF's misguided attempt to redefine forced reset triggers as machine guns isn't just a battle win, it's the first in a series of victories we anticipate in the larger war to rein in - and ultimately abolish - an overzealous ATF."

=== 2024 ===
In the fall of 2024, McNutt joined several Texas legislators in calling on the State Fair of Texas to reverse its ban on the licensed carry of firearms. He criticized the policy as ineffective, stating, "Gun free zones don't work. This is another feel-good attempt that accomplishes absolutely nothing for safety." Following a court decision that declined to block the ban, McNutt pledged to pursue the issue during the upcoming legislative session in Austin.
