= Shooting of Jacob Blake =

2020 police shooting in Kenosha

- Image of Blake falling into the vehicle after the 5th shot
- Date: August 23, 2020; 6 years ago
- Time: c. 5:15 pm (CDT)
- Location: Kenosha, Wisconsin, U.S.; 42°36′02.3″N 87°50′35.8″W
- Type: Police shooting
- Participants: Officer Rusten Sheskey of the Kenosha Police Department
- Injuries: Gunshot wounds; paralyzed from the waist down; damage to stomach, kidney, and liver; most of small intestines and colon removed.
- Charges: None

On August 23, 2020, Jacob S. Blake, a 29-year-old Black man, was shot and seriously injured by police officer Rusten Sheskey in Kenosha, Wisconsin. Blake held a knife in his right hand and opened the driver's door of an SUV before turning towards Sheskey, who shot Blake in the back four times and the side three times. Sheskey said that he believed he was about to be stabbed. Earlier during the encounter, Blake had been tased by two officers, but the tasers failed to disable him and he continued toward the vehicle.

Blake had a warrant for his arrest from July, based on charges of third-degree felony sexual assault (Note: There are four degrees of sexual assault in Wisconsin, based upon the harm done to the victim and the amount of force used by the perpetrator. Third-degree sexual assaults are felonies. See "Definitions and Wisconsin Laws". University of Wisconsin. Archived from the original on October 9, 2021.) and trespassing and disorderly conduct for domestic abuse in May. Both Kenosha Police Chief Daniel Miskinis and the Kenosha Professional Police Association stated that the officers dispatched on August 23 were aware of the pending warrant for Blake before they arrived on scene; dispatch records confirm this.

The police shooting was followed by widespread unrest in Kenosha, which included rallies, marches, property damage, arson, and clashes with police. During the unrest, two men were fatally shot by an armed civilian, 17-year-old Kyle Rittenhouse from Antioch, Illinois. Blake's name was invoked in protests in other cities as part of the Black Lives Matter movement, which resurged in the wake of several high-profile killings by police officers in 2020.

In January 2021, Kenosha County prosecutors announced that the officers involved in the shooting would not be charged, and Sheskey returned to regular police duty in April 2021.

Prosecutors also announced that Blake would not face any new charges. After the mother of Blake's children refused to cooperate with prosecutors, they dropped the previous sexual assault and trespassing charges against Blake in exchange for him pleading guilty to two misdemeanor counts of disorderly conduct and domestic abuse, for which he was sentenced to two years of probation.

== Shooting ==
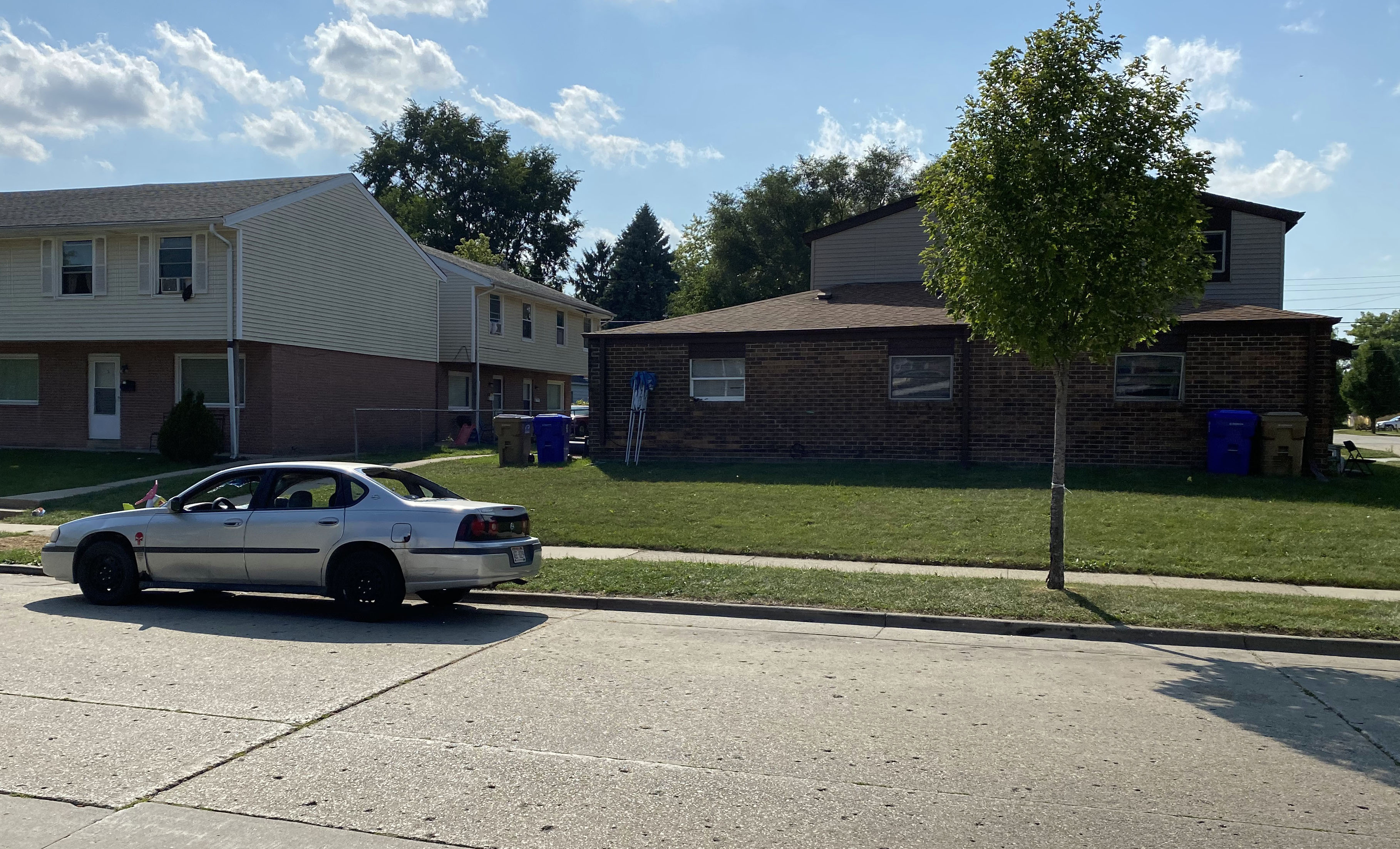
The site where police shot Blake, five days after the incident

On August 23, 2020, Kenosha police responded to a 9-1-1 call about a "domestic incident" at approximately 5:11 p.m. According to multiple official sources, the female caller referred to Blake as her "boyfriend", said he was not permitted to be on the premises, and that he had taken her car keys and was refusing to give them back. Officers were also informed by the dispatcher that there was a "wanted" alert for someone at the address, indicated by police code 10–99. Blake had a warrant for his arrest from July, based on charges of third-degree sexual assault, trespassing, and disorderly conduct for domestic abuse in May. The woman who called 9-1-1 on August 23 to report that Blake had stolen her keys was the same woman who had previously filed the criminal complaint alleging that Blake had sexually assaulted her. Both Kenosha Police Chief Daniel Miskinis and the Kenosha Professional Police Association stated that the officers dispatched on August 23 were aware of the pending warrant for Blake before they arrived on scene.

One witness said that Blake pulled his car up near "six or seven women shouting at each other on the sidewalk" and "Blake did not say anything to the women". According to other witnesses, Blake was trying to intervene between two women who were arguing when police arrived. Officers attempted to subdue Blake, and two officers used tasers on him. A bystander who recorded a video of the incident told reporters that he heard police yelling "drop the knife". The police union said that Blake was armed with a knife in his left hand, but officers did not initially see it, and he "forcefully fought with the officers, including putting one of [them] in a headlock", while ignoring orders to drop the knife. "Based on the inability to gain compliance and control after using verbal, physical and less-lethal means, the officers drew their firearms," the police union added.

One of Blake's attorneys disputed this version of events, calling it "overblown", and saying that the police officers were the aggressors and immediately became physical with Blake upon arriving at the scene.

After an initial scuffle, Blake walked to the driver's side of his girlfriend's rented vehicle, followed by officer Rusten Sheskey and another officer with handguns drawn. Sheskey attempted to grab Blake, and when Blake opened the driver's side door and leaned in, Sheskey grabbed him and fired seven shots towards Blake's back. According to Blake's attorney, four of the shots hit Blake. According to Sheskey's attorney, Sheskey saw Blake put a child in the vehicle as he arrived, and heard a woman say, "He's got my kid. He's got my keys"; Sheskey shot Blake believing he was attempting to kidnap the child in the backseat of the vehicle he was entering, and because Blake had a knife in his hand and twisted his body toward Sheskey. In a press conference on August 26, 2020, Wisconsin Attorney General Josh Kaul said that a knife was recovered from the driver-side front floorboard of the car Blake was leaning into when he was shot in the back. Kaul also said that Blake "admitted that he had a knife in his possession." The prosecutor who oversaw the investigation said that Blake admitted to holding a knife and that statements from officers and witnesses had indicated that Blake turned toward officer Sheskey with the knife immediately before the shooting. According to Blake, he intended to put the knife in the SUV and then lie on the ground to submit to the police officers. He said he "wasn't thinking clearly" and picked up a knife during the altercation, but denied having the intent to use it. He was shot within three minutes of the police arriving.

== Medical aftermath for Blake ==
Blake was flown to Froedtert Hospital in Wauwatosa, Wisconsin. His father announced on August 25 that Blake was paralyzed from the waist down and that doctors do not yet know if it would be permanent. He also suffered a gunshot wound to one arm and damage to his stomach, kidney, and liver; he had to have most of his small intestines and colon removed. Blake was initially handcuffed to his hospital bed and guarded by two officers due to an outstanding warrant. The handcuffs were removed and the officers stopped guarding Blake after he posted bond.

As of August 2021, Blake said in an interview that he was able to take a few steps, "which he compared to sliding his legs through a woodchipper", and that he was suffering from anxiety attacks.

== Investigation and legal proceedings ==
Kenosha police referred the investigation of the shooting to the Wisconsin Division of Criminal Investigation. The investigation's findings went to district attorney Michael D. Graveley, the local official responsible for deciding whether to bring charges against the officers. Graveley stated on August 25, 2020, that the investigation was in "its earliest stages". On the same day, the United States Department of Justice also announced an investigation into the shooting. The investigation would look into whether Blake's civil rights were violated. In October 2021, the Department of Justice announced it will not pursue federal civil rights charges against the officer, citing insufficient evidence that proves the officer willfully violated federal civil rights statutes.

Blake's family retained civil rights attorney Ben Crump, who also represented the families of Trayvon Martin and Michael Brown, to represent Blake in their civil suit. Crump called for the officer who shot Blake to be arrested, and others involved to be fired.

On August 26, Wisconsin attorney general Josh Kaul announced that officer Sheskey was the only officer who fired his weapon. All were placed on administrative leave.

On August 28, the police union said that most narratives about the shooting were wholly inaccurate and purely fictional, including information from Blake's attorneys. It also criticized a statement released by the Wisconsin Department of Justice's Division of Criminal Investigation, which led the investigation into the police shooting, as "riddled with incomplete information".

On September 4, 2020, Blake pleaded not guilty to the July sexual assault charge, appearing via Zoom from his hospital bed. In November 2020, Blake reached a deal with the prosecution where the charges of sexual assault were dropped in return for his pleading guilty to two charges of misdemeanor disorderly conduct and domestic abuse, for which he was sentenced to two years probation. According to the Walworth County district attorney, Zeke Wiedenfeld, the fact that Blake's accuser had ignored a subpoena and was refusing to cooperate contributed to the decision to allow him to plead out to lesser charges.

On September 21, Wisconsin Attorney General Josh Kaul appointed a former sheriff of Madison, Wisconsin, to review the work of Wisconsin Department of Justice investigators and provide a written report to the Kenosha County District Attorney.

On January 5, 2021, Kenosha County District Attorney Michael Graveley, the top prosecutor in the county, declined to bring charges against police officer Rusten Sheskey. He said that investigators had reviewed 40 hours of video and hundreds of pages of police reports before making the decision.

In April 2021, it was reported that Sheskey has returned to regular duty and will not face any administrative discipline.

In October 2021, the US Department of Justice announced it would not be bringing civil rights charges against Sheskey.

In May 2022, Jacob Blake withdrew his civil lawsuit against the officer who shot him. He refiled his civil suit on August 23, 2023, but again voluntarily dismissed it on September 8, 2023.

== Reactions ==
=== Public ===
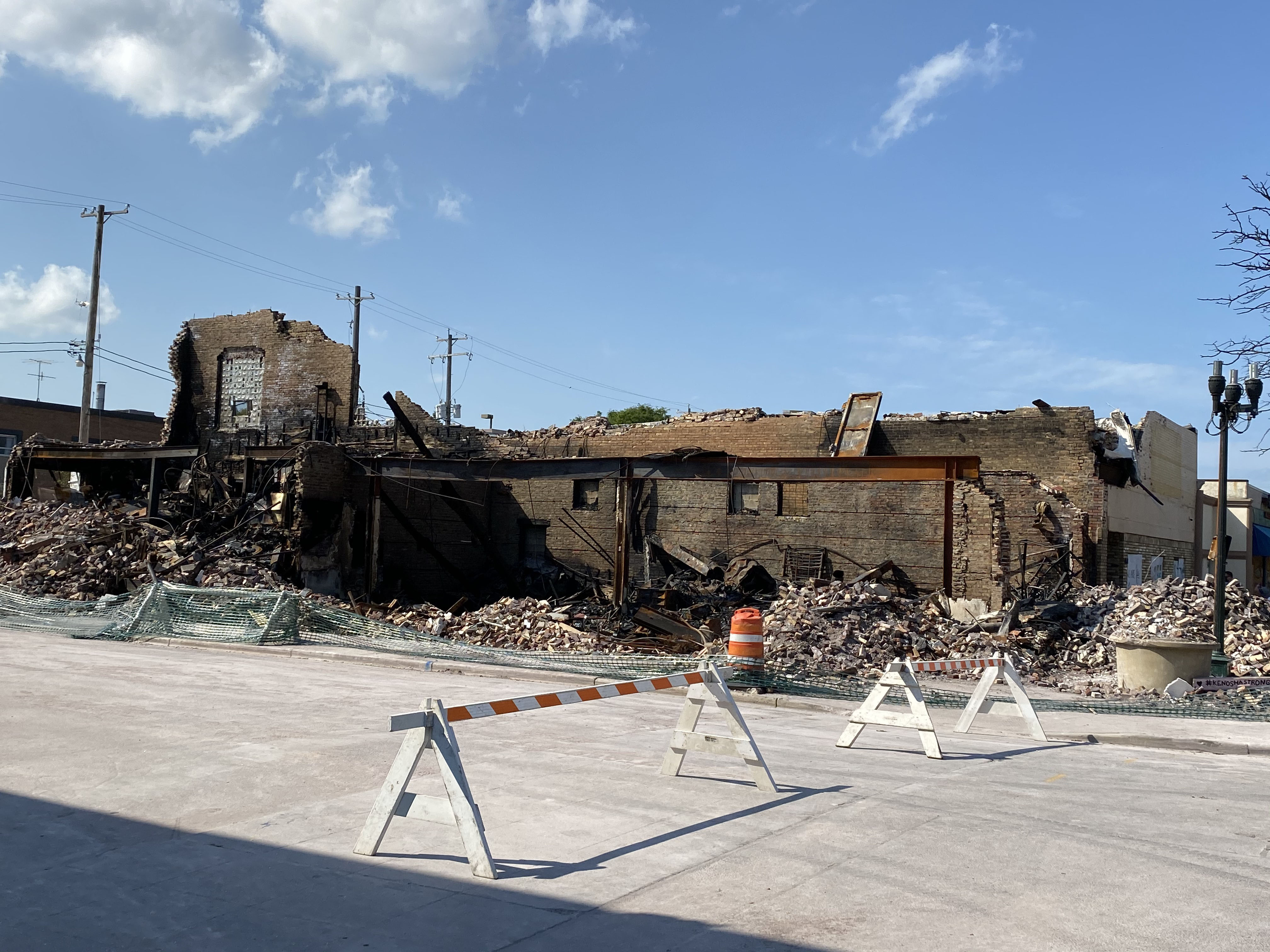
Ruins of a Mattress Shop and Danish Brotherhood Lodge burned during riots

Protests followed, leading Kenosha County to declare a state of emergency overnight on August 24 after police vehicles were damaged, a dump truck set on fire, and the local courthouse vandalized. An officer was knocked down with a brick, and tear gas was deployed. Police urged 24-hour businesses to consider closing because of numerous calls about armed robberies and shots being fired, and the Wisconsin National Guard was deployed to maintain public safety. Up to 200 members were to be deployed. On August 24, the protesters set fires and looted businesses for a second night. On August 25, the protests and fires continued throughout Kenosha, and civilians armed with guns patrolled parts of the city.

On August 25, a 17-year-old youth from Illinois shot three men during the unrest, killing Joseph Rosenbaum and Anthony Huber. Less than 2 hours after the shooting, shortly before 1:30 a.m. the following day, Kyle Rittenhouse, a 17-year-old male, turned himself in to police in Antioch, Illinois. The youth was charged with first-degree intentional homicide. His defense lawyers argued that the shootings were in self-defense. On November 19, 2021, in a unanimous jury verdict, Rittenhouse was acquitted of all five charges.

Public protests regarding Blake's shooting occurred in many other cities, including New York, Minneapolis, Los Angeles, and Atlanta.

=== Sports ===
Multiple professional sports teams went on strike in protest, refusing to play their scheduled games. In the NBA Bubble, the Milwaukee Bucks boycotted their August 26 first-round playoff game against the Orlando Magic in protest of the shooting. The team decided not to come out of their locker room minutes before the scheduled start to the game. Later that day, the National Basketball Association (NBA) and the National Basketball Players Association announced that in light of the Bucks' decision to refuse to play, all NBA games for the day were postponed. This led to other boycotts from other American sports leagues, including the Women's National Basketball Association (WNBA), Major League Baseball (MLB), and Major League Soccer (MLS).

=== Government ===
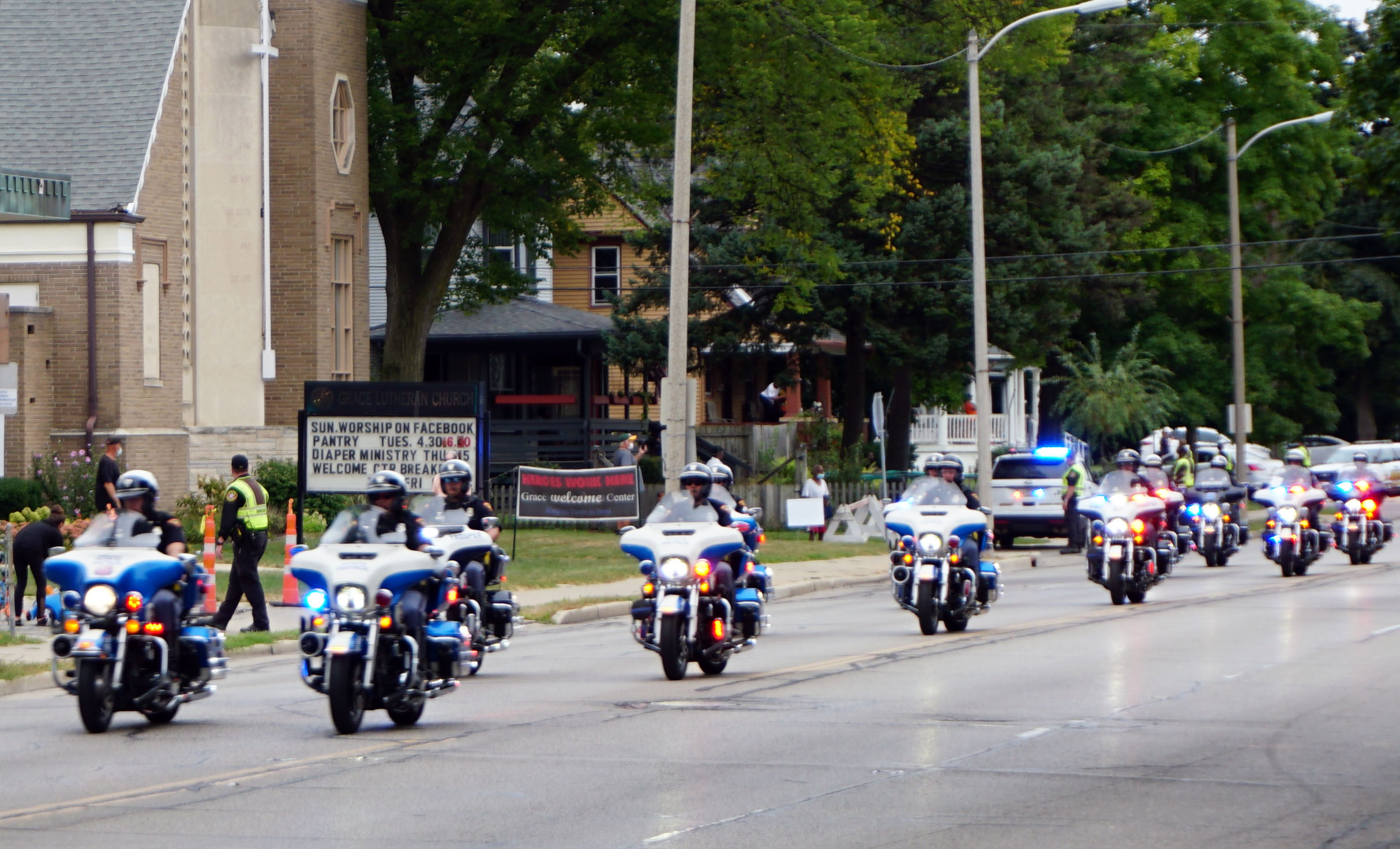
Trump's motorcade in Kenosha

Wisconsin Governor Tony Evers issued a statement denouncing the excessive use of force by police and invoking the names of African Americans killed by law enforcement. Evers said, "While we do not have all of the details yet, what we know for certain is that he is not the first black man or person to have been shot or injured or mercilessly killed at the hands of individuals in law enforcement in our state or our country." Evers called Wisconsin state lawmakers to a special session in order to pass legislation addressing police brutality.

On August 24, 2020, Wisconsin Lieutenant Governor Mandela Barnes said the shooting was not an accident, and "This wasn't bad police work. This felt like some sort of vendetta taken out on a member of our community." On the 2021 anniversary of the shooting, Barnes released a statement condemning how "systemic racism continues to ravage communities of color" and remembering how "Jacob Blake was shot in the back seven times in front of his children."

Former Vice President and 2020 Democratic presidential nominee Joe Biden said "these shots pierce the soul of our nation" and called for an "immediate, full, and transparent investigation". Biden and his running mate Kamala Harris spoke to Blake's father for an hour. On September 3, Biden and his wife Jill met with multiple members of Blake's family at Milwaukee Mitchell International Airport for 90 minutes; Blake joined the meeting by phone from his hospital bed. Biden then went to Kenosha to speak with members of the community at a local church. This was his first campaign trip to Wisconsin. Harris spoke to Blake by telephone on September 7.

President Donald Trump called the family, but Blake's mother Julia Black later apologized for missing the call, while Blake's father said Trump had not tried to reach out. Trump later said the shooting "was not a good sight. I didn't like the sight of it, certainly, and I think most people would agree with that." Trump scheduled a trip to Kenosha on September 1 to see the damage caused by the unrest and to meet with law enforcement, but Governor Evers and Mayor John Antaramian asked him to reconsider his visit over concerns that his presence would hinder efforts to "overcome division". Trump made the trip, accompanied by U.S. Attorney General William Barr, but he did not meet with Blake's family because, he said, they wanted legal counsel present at the meeting. They held discussions with the county sheriff, the chief of police, and others, and Trump promised financial help to city and state law enforcement, and to businesses which had been burned down. On September 9, Barr contrasted the murder of George Floyd with the Blake shooting, saying, "Floyd was already subdued, incapacitated in handcuffs and was not armed. In the Jacob case, he was in the midst of committing a felony and he was armed."
