= Walter McNutt =

American politician from Montana

Member of the Montana House of Representatives from the 37th district
- In office 2005 to 2012

Personal details
- Born: November 8, 1940 (age 85) Worland, Wyoming
- Party: Republican
- Education: College of Great Falls

Walter McNutt (born November 8, 1940) is an American politician who was a Republican member of the Montana House of Representatives from 2005 until 2012. He was elected to House District 37 which represents the Sidney, Montana area. McNutt also served in the Senate from 1997 to 2004.
