= John G. McNutt =

John G. McNutt (born 1951) is professor emeritus in the Biden School of Public Policy and Administration at the University of Delaware and is engaged in the study of the use of information and communication technologies in the nonprofit sector in the United States. Much of his work focuses on electronic advocacy, especially the application of technology, data, and data science to social action and public policy making and the use of evidence in informing social policy. McNutt has conducted research on child advocacy groups, professional associations, environmental advocacy organizations, political action committees, transnational advocacy organizations and community development corporations. His current work examines four interrelated areas: (1) technology and advocacy for social change, (2) the role of data and data science in public policy, (3) the changing nature of social policy in an information society, and (4) Informatics in the public and nonprofit sectors. Before starting his academic career, McNutt was a social worker and VISTA Volunteer.

He earned a B.A. from Mars Hill College (1974), an M.S.W. from the University of Alabama (1978), and a Ph.D. from the University of Tennessee (1991).
