= Tico McNutt =

John Weldon McNutt
- Born: Seattle, Washington
- Known for: Conservationist, Conservation biologist
- Spouse(s): Lesley Boggs-McNutt, Director of Coaching for Conservation
- Children: Madison McNutt, Wilder McNutt

John McNutt, known as Tico McNutt, started the Wild Dog Research Project in 1989. His research in that field has been supported in part by the National Geographic Society. He received a doctorate in animal behavior from the University of California in 1995. At the time, he founded the Botswana Wild Dog Research Project as little was known about the biology of the African wild dog (Lycaon pictus), though it was believed to be one of the most endangered canine species. Since then, Tico has followed many wild dog packs in Botswana’s Okavango Delta, eventually expanding his studies to include all major predators in the region.

McNutt is co-author of the book Running Wild: Dispelling the Myths of the African Wild Dog
