= Eau Claire =

Eau Claire (French for "clear water", pl. eaux claires) (Note: The name is pronounced as if it were spelled "O'Clare".) is the name of a number of locations and features in North America. Eau Claire may refer to:

== Places ==
=== Canada ===
- Eau Claire, Calgary, a neighborhood in Calgary, Alberta
- Eau Claire, Ontario, a community approximately 8 miles (13 km) west of Mattawa, Ontario
- Eaux Claires, Edmonton, a neighborhood in Edmonton, Alberta

=== United States ===
- Eau Claire, Michigan, a village
- Eau Claire, Pennsylvania, a borough
- Eau Claire, South Carolina, a suburban neighborhood of Columbia, South Carolina
- Eau Claire, Wisconsin, a city and the largest incorporated place by this name
  - Eau Claire County, Wisconsin, a county of which the city of Eau Claire is the seat
- Little Eau Claire, Wisconsin, an unincorporated community in Marathon County

== Geographic features ==
=== Canada ===
- Eau Claire Gorge, a section of rapids along the Amable du Fond River near Eau Claire, Ontario
- Lac à l'Eau Claire, a lake in northern Quebec, now formally named Lac Wiyâshâkimî

=== United States ===
- Eau Claire River (disambiguation), three rivers in Wisconsin (disambiguated by the river to which each is a tributary):
  - Eau Claire River (Chippewa River tributary)
  - Eau Claire River (St. Croix River tributary)
  - Eau Claire River (Wisconsin River tributary)
- Lake Eau Claire, a reservoir in eastern Eau Claire County, Wisconsin, formed by a dam on the Eau Claire River (Chippewa River tributary)

== Other uses ==
All in the U.S. state of Wisconsin

- Eau Claire Marathon, held annually since 2009
- University of Wisconsin–Eau Claire, established in 1916, so-named since 1971

=== Sports teams ===
- Eau Claire Axemen, an indoor football team
- Eau Claire Bears, a defunct minor-league baseball team
- Eau Claire Commissioners, a defunct minor-league baseball team
- Eau Claire Express, a collegiate baseball team

== See also ==
- Eaux Claires, a music and arts festival held in Eau Claire, Wisconsin
