= Roosevelt, Taylor County, Wisconsin =

Roosevelt, Wisconsin
- Town
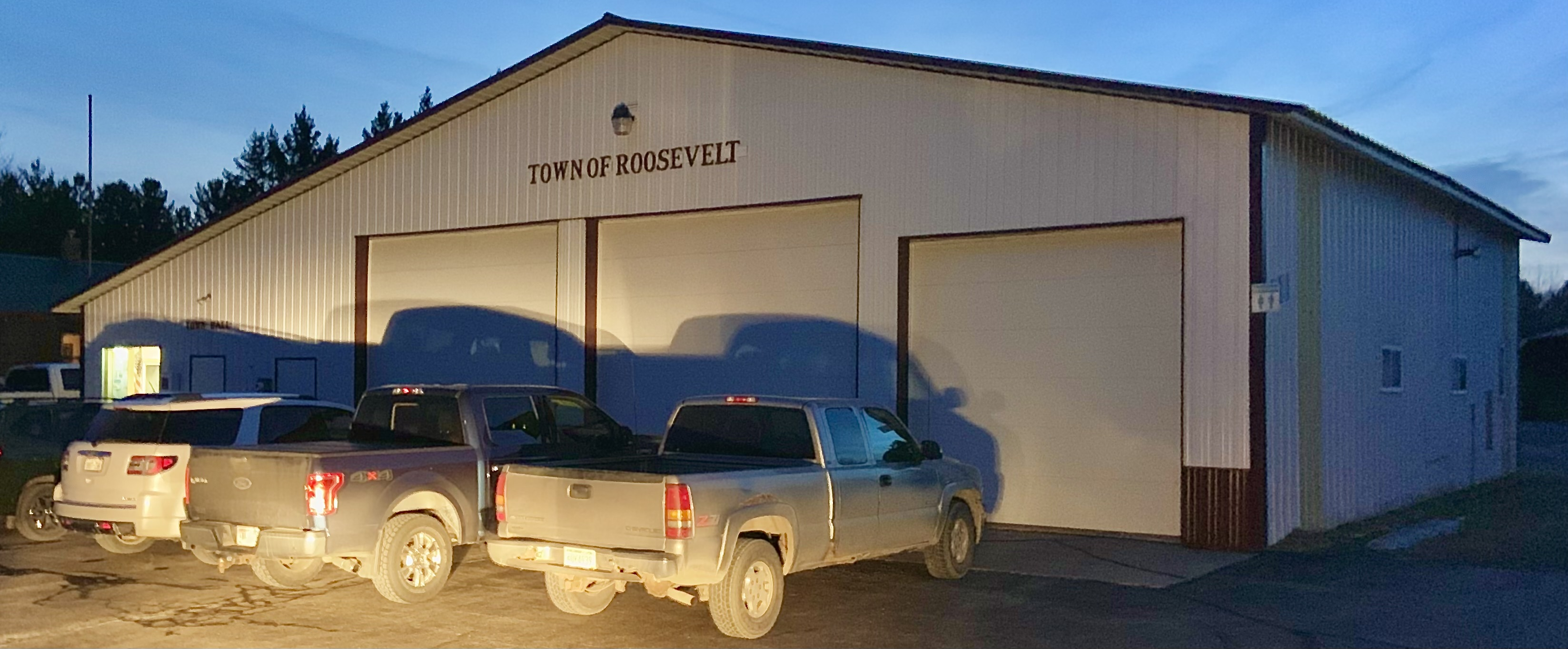
- Town hall

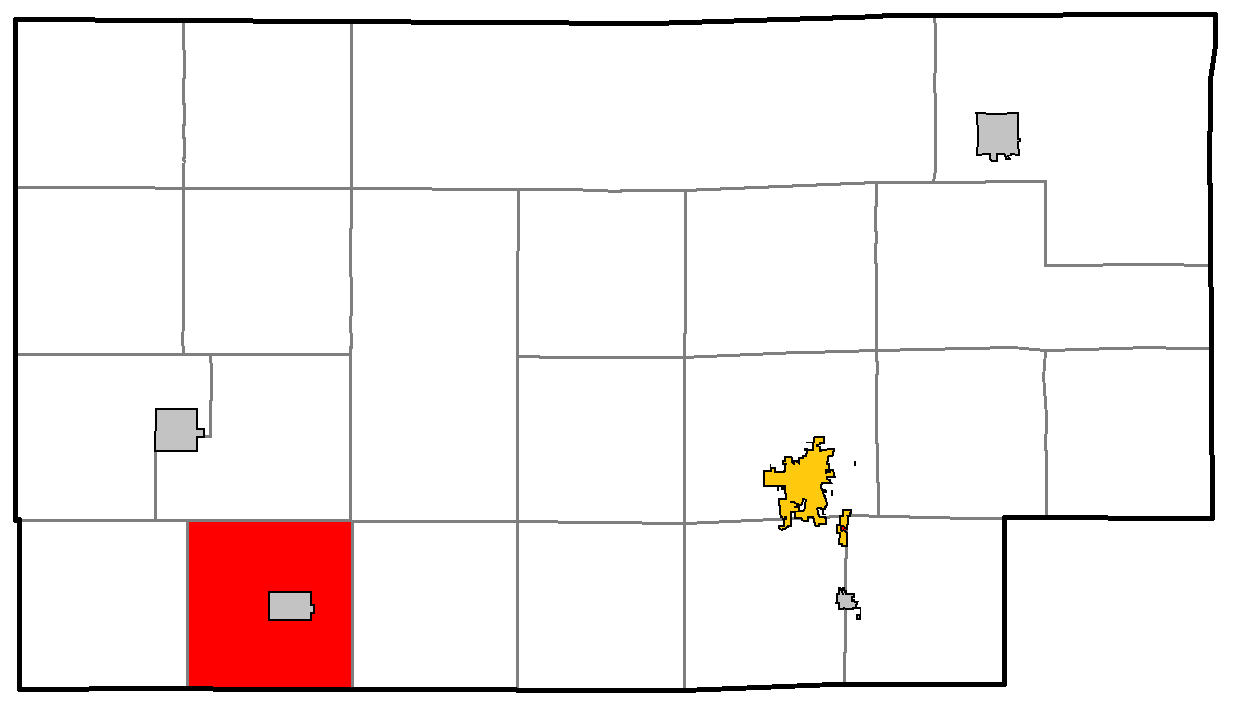
- Location of Roosevelt, within Taylor County

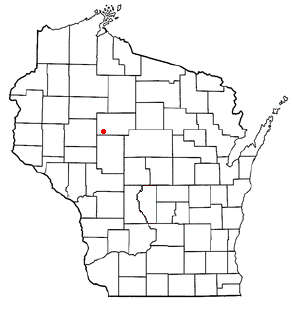
- Location of Roosevelt, Taylor County, Wisconsin
- Coordinates: 45°3′51″N 90°43′46″W
- Country: United States
- State: Wisconsin
- County: Taylor

Area
  - Total: 34.5 sq mi (89.4 km^{2})
  - Land: 34.4 sq mi (89.1 km^{2})
  - Water: 0.12 sq mi (0.3 km^{2})
- Elevation: 1,299 ft (396 m)

Population (2020)
  - Total: 478
  - Density: 13.9/sq mi (5.36/km^{2})
- Time zone: UTC-6 (Central (CST))
  - Summer (DST): UTC-5 (CDT)
- Area codes: 715 & 534
- FIPS code: 55-69400
- GNIS feature ID: 1584062
- PLSS township: T30N R3W

Roosevelt is a town in Taylor County, Wisconsin, United States. The population was 478 at the 2020 census. The village of Lublin lies within the town of Roosevelt. The unincorporated community of Bellinger is also located partially in the town.

== Geography ==
According to the United States Census Bureau, the town has a total area of 34.5 square miles (89.4 km^{2}), of which 34.4 square miles (89.1 km^{2}) is land and 0.1 square mile (0.3 km^{2}) (0.38%) is water.

On the eastern edge of Roosevelt is Diamond Lake, a Wisconsin State Natural Area, which is managed as an ecological reference area.

== History ==
In July 1847 a crew working for the U.S. government surveyed the boundaries of the six mile square which would become Roosevelt. Then in June 1854 another crew marked all the section corners in the township, walking through the woods and swamps, measuring with chain and compass. When done, the deputy surveyor filed this general description:

The Surface of This Township is generally Broken Soil(?) poor 3rd Rate. Timber is principally Hemlock. There is Some little White Pine Scattered through the Township but of poor quality. The Township is well watered with numerous Small Streams. There are no Settlers in the Township.

Around 1900 most of what would become Roosevelt was owned by lumber companies, with the Northwestern Lumber Company owning the most, especially in the south half, and Chippewa Lumber and Boom Co. owning some large blocks in the north. A map shows a logging dam on the Eau Claire River in section 31. No homesteads appeared on the map at this time. Big changes were coming soon.

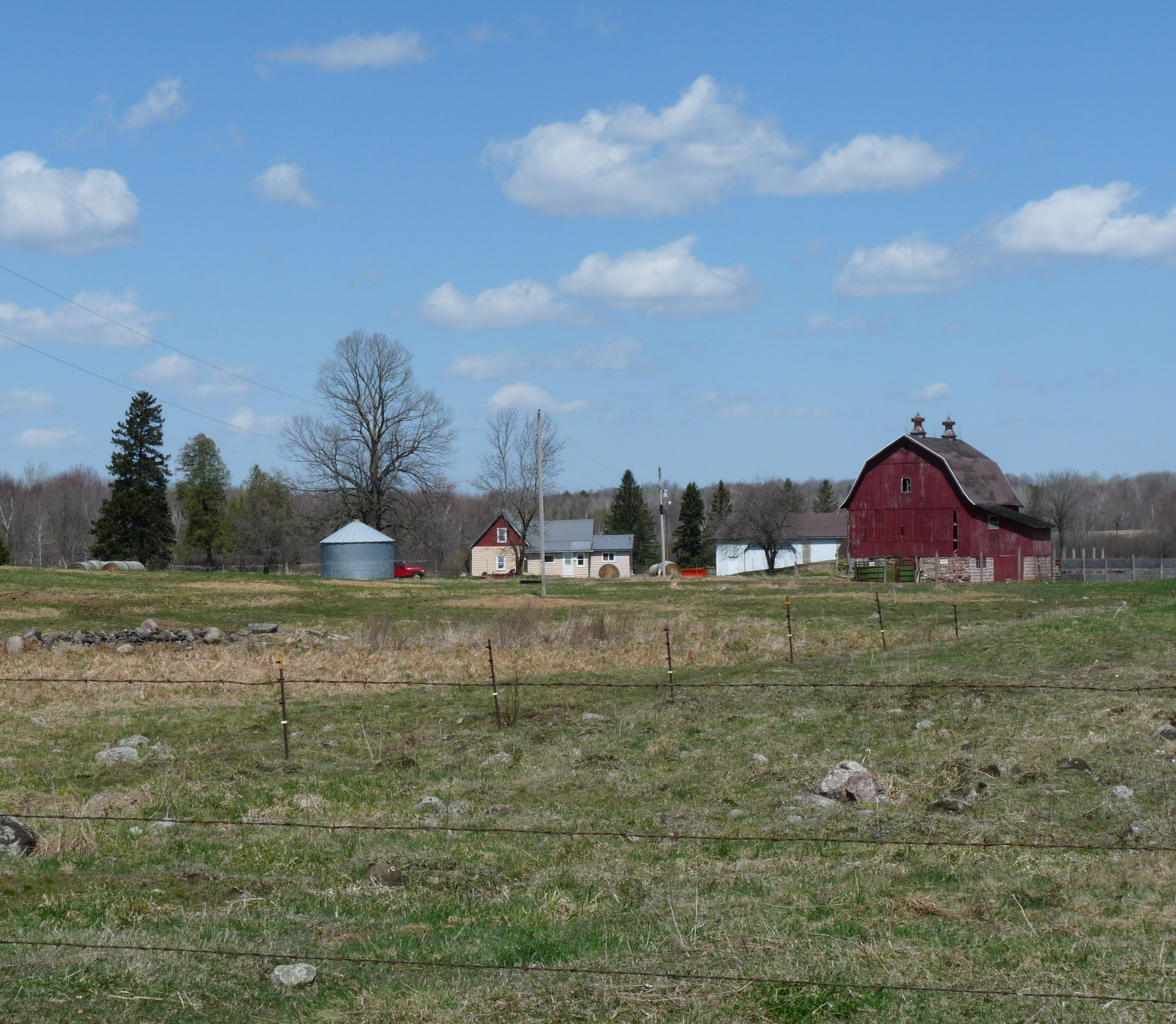
Many farms in Roosevelt were carved out of choppy, rocky ground .

Around 1905 the J.S. Owen Company built a rail line for the Wisconsin Central Railway heading northwest across the town for Ladysmith and Superior. That same year the Taylor County Board created the Town of Roosevelt, splitting it off from the initial Town of Little Black, which had spanned the width of Taylor County.

The 1911 plat map of Roosevelt shows the Wisconsin Central/Soo Line cutting across the township from southeast to northwest, passing through Lublin. From Lublin, The Owen Lumber Company has a logging spur branching off to Diamond Lake and beyond. A road of some sort heads west from Lublin, following the course of modern County F. More roads cover the southwest corner of the town, which is pretty well settled, with many of the names Polish. The map shows two schools in this area and one back in Lublin. There is also a well-settled block northeast of Lublin. This settlement around Lublin and its continuation into what is now Taft were by far the largest collection of farmer-settlers in western Taylor County at this time - much more than around Gilman. Other than those settled areas, most of the town was in the hands of Chippewa Lumber and Boom Co., State Land Co., and the American Immigration Co. The transition from logging to farming was well underway.

== Demographics ==
As of the census of 2000, there were 444 people, 149 households, and 116 families residing in the town. The population density was 12.9 people per square mile (5.0/km^{2}). There were 169 housing units at an average density of 4.9 per square mile (1.9/km^{2}). The racial makeup of the town was 100.00% White.

There were 149 households, out of which 34.9% had children under the age of 18 living with them, 65.1% were married couples living together, 9.4% had a female householder with no husband present, and 22.1% were non-families. 18.1% of all households were made up of individuals, and 12.8% had someone living alone who was 65 years of age or older. The average household size was 2.98 and the average family size was 3.42.

In the town, the population was spread out, with 27.7% under the age of 18, 8.6% from 18 to 24, 22.5% from 25 to 44, 23.9% from 45 to 64, and 17.3% who were 65 years of age or older. The median age was 39 years. For every 100 females, there were 112.4 males. For every 100 females age 18 and over, there were 112.6 males.

The median income for a household in the town was $32,000, and the median income for a family was $37,750. Males had a median income of $26,786 versus $24,500 for females. The per capita income for the town was $15,476. About 10.4% of families and 9.0% of the population were below the poverty line, including 4.5% of those under age 18 and 17.5% of those age 65 or over.

== Notable people ==
- Joseph Sweda, Wisconsin State Representative, farmer, and businessman, lived in the town; Sweda served as chairman of the Roosevelt Town Board
