= Buckshot (disambiguation) =

Buckshot is a term for large shotgun cartridges.

Buckshot may also refer to:

== People ==
- Buckshot (rapper) (born 1974), American rapper
- Buckshot Hoffner (1924–2015), American politician
- Buckshot Jones (born 1970), American racing driver
- Buckshot May (1899–1984), American baseball pitcher
- Buckshot Morris, American racing driver
- Buckshot Roberts (c. 1831–1878), American frontiersman
- Nickname of Clarence Underwood (1912–1985), American football coach
- Nickname of Ralph O'Brien (1928–2018), American basketball player
- Nickname of Stephen Calvert, American football quarterback
- Nickname of William Edward Forster (1818–1886), British politician and businessman

== Media ==
- Buckshot LeFonque, American jazz band
  - Buckshot LeFonque, album by the band
- Buckshot Roulette, tabletop horror video game
- Buckshot John, American silent Western film
- The Buck Shot Show Canadian children's television show
- "Buckshot", song by Macklemore & Ryan Lewis from This Unruly Mess I've Made
- Colonel Wilburforce Buckshot, a character from Another Fine Mess

== Other uses ==
- Buckshot, Arizona, census-designated place
- Buckshot Racing, NASCAR team active between 1995 and 2002
- Buckshot Run, annual event in Eau Claire, Wisconsin
- Buckshot War, 1838 civil unrest in Pennsylvania
- Goodwin Buckshot, model of powered parachute
- Operation Buckshot, planned operation of the Western Desert campaign
- Operation Buckshot Yankee, counteroperation against the 2008 malware infection of the United States Department of Defense
