= Eau Claire Marathon =

American road race

- Date: April 27, 2025
- Location: Eau Claire, Wisconsin
- Event type: Paved Road
- Distance: 26.2 miles (42.2 km)
- Primary sponsor: Royal Credit Union
- Established: 2009 (17 years ago)
- Course records: women: Rachel Ragona (2021), 2:48:34 men: David Luy (2018), 2:23:09
- Website: www.eauclairemarathon.com
- Participants: 5000

The Eau Claire Marathon is an annual marathon that takes place in Eau Claire, Wisconsin in the United States. The race starts and finishes at Phoenix Park and features views of the Chippewa River. In 2023 and 2025, RaceRaves announced the Eau Claire was the best marathon in Wisconsin based on feedback they received. Similarly, the half marathon accompanying the Eau Claire Marathon received similar honors in 2024.

The Eau Claire Marathon is credited with boosting tourism to the city of Eau Claire. In 2025, the Eau Claire Marathon generated $5.4 million dollars for the local community.

== Course ==
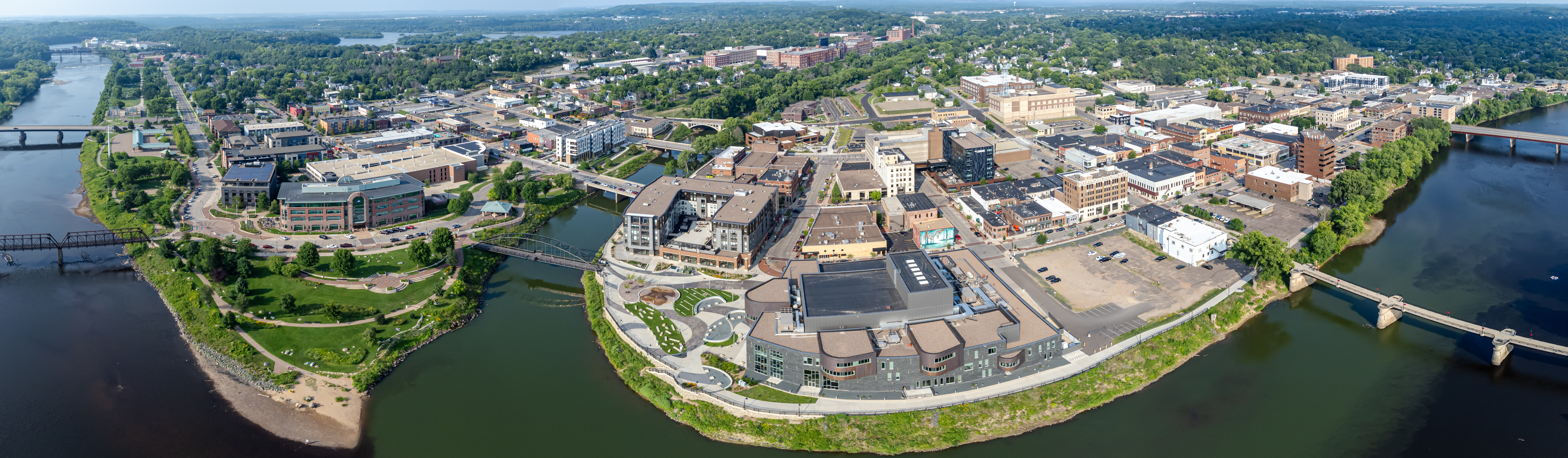
Phoenix Park in foreground on left side and numerous bridges used as part of the marathon

The race starts at Phoenix Park in Eau Claire and features several unique features including:

- Blugold mile through the University of Wisconsin-Eau Claire campus
- musical mile
- Barstow Block Party at approximately mile 23.5 miles (37.8 km)
- eight bridge crossings

The course has 590 feet (180 m) of elevation gain, although it has only 2 feet (61 cm) of net elevation gain. The race course closes after six hours.

Former Eau Claire Marathon winner Adam Condit described the Eau Claire Marathon course as a midwest version of the New York City Marathon given the numerous bridge crossings and different neighborhood feels. Don Alexander, who finished second in the marathon in 2016, said the crowd support near the University of Wisconsin-Eau Claire campus was "as good as Boylston Street in Boston." The right turn on Hereford and left turn on Boylston is perhaps the most famous segment of the Boston Marathon.

== Race history ==
Eau Claire had an eponymous marathon from 1982 to 1985. The Indianhead Track Club Eau Claire Marathon was first run on May 2, 1982, with 95 finishers and was directed by Rick Kettner. The 1982 race started at Wilson Park and finished at Eau Claire North High School.

The second Eau Claire Marathon was run on May 8, 1983. The 1983 course started at the corner of Grand and Graham in Eau Claire and finished at the Lake Altoona pavilion, and was run by more than 100 runners. More than 100 runners participated in the 1983 Eau Claire Marathon. The 1983 race cost $3 to enter, but was advertised as being for "men and boys only."

Barney Klecker won the 1984 Eau Claire Marathon with a time of 2:28:51 despite starting late. The 1984 women's winner, Cindy Spaeth, was planning on running the first 16 miles of the race as a training run until a spectator told her she was the lead woman. About 130 runners competed in the marathon that year.

About 100 runners were expected for the 1985 Eau Claire Marathon. The race started at the intersection of Main and Graham, and finished at Lake Altoona park.

The current iteration of the Eau Claire Marathon was started in 2009. The race directors were Karen and Kevin Drechsel. Karen Drechsel said she was inspired to start a marathon in her hometown after seeing crowds at the Green Bay Marathon, Grandma's Marathon, and Twin Cities Marathon.

Patrick Russel won the men's race in 2009. According to Karen Drechsel, 1700 runners participated in Eau Claire Marathon-affiliated events including 270 in the marathon during its inaugural year. The race started and finished at Carson Park. The first year raised $32,000 for the Eau Claire YMCA. A passing train blocked runners during the race.

The second running of the race in 2010 featured minor changes and was still held at Carson Park. First, the marathon, half marathon, and two mile race shared the same finish line for the first time. Second, chip timing was introduced. Jessop Keene won the men's race with a time of 3:01:55, while Wendy Miller won the women's race with a time of 3:12:18. A total of 1,800 runners participated in all three Eau Claire Marathon-affiliated events the second year including 178 who ran the marathon. The race costs $80,000 to $100,000 to put on, and generated a $65,000 profit. The Eau Claire Convention and Visitors Bureau estimates the race brought $256,500 to the local economy. The Eau Claire Marathon was a Boston Marathon-qualifying race.

The third running of the Eau Claire Marathon in 2011 drew 1200 runners in all three events including 338 runners from 21 states running the full marathon. Patrick Russell won the men's race with a time of 2:50:59, while Lisa Tavares won the women's race with a time of 3:22:39. The race faced cold, rainy weather and possible flooding for the first time.

The fourth running of the Eau Claire Marathon took place in 2012. About 1700 runners signed up for all three races including 360 runners who signed up for the marathon. University of Wisconsin-Eau Claire students volunteered to stuff race packets for marathon participants. Patrick Russell won the men's race with a time of 2:36:17, while April Cole won the women's race with a time of 3:12:06.

The fifth running of the Eau Claire Marathon took place in 2013. The cancellation of the 2013 La Crosse Marathon was thought to have helped Eau Claire Marathon participation numbers. A total of 1469 runners participated in Eau Claire Marathon-affiliated events in 2013. Scott Hayden won the men's race with a time of 2:36:51, while Sarah McCall won the women's race with a time of 3:15:00. A passing train obstructed half-marathon runners at approximately 8 miles (13 km) into the race. The amount of litter left over after the race along the course drew complaints for the first time.

After having raised $120,000 for the Eau Claire YMCA to put up a new building, Karen Drechsel announced in November 2013 that the 2014 race would not take place. Mike Salm, who directed the Buckshot Run that year, said he was "shocked" at the cancellation but understood if the Drechsels were burned out. Karen Drechsel had rights to the term "Eau Claire Marathon." Less than three weeks later, the Eau Claire Marathon organization announced Pat Toutant would be the new race director and would be sponsored by Scheels. Emily Uelmen, the daughter of Toutant, is also a co-race director. Toutant and Uelmen ran the Eau Claire Marathon relay as a four-person relay with their spouses and fell in love with the race, and Toutant called Uelmen to ask if they should take over the marathon together. Toutant was on the verge of retiring and Uelmen's children were just short of being in kindergarten, so the timing worked out well for both of them. The Powertex Group designed the current Eau Claire Marathon logo that year.

The sixth running of the Eau Claire Marathon took place in 2014 with several changes. First, the course was rerouted in order to avoid railroad crossings and improve the scenic appeal of the race. Second, the starting time of the marathon, half-marathon, and two mile races were staggered to reduce congestion in Carson Park. And third, race officials were able to get the city of Eau Claire to open bathrooms in Carson Park for the event. Fourth, a family zone was added with face-painting. And fifth, the race considered having to cap entrants to 2500 runners across all three events for the first time. Fifth, no music was played before the race to avoid noise-complaints from neighbors near the start of the race. In addition, rain required the race be re-routed near Owen Park and Hobbs Municipal Ice Center. The race remained certified despite the changes.

Kristin Weinzierl won the women's race in 2014 with a time of 3:09:16, while Eric Glaubke won the men's race with a time of 2:45:06. A total of 2500 runners participated in Eau Claire Marathon-affiliated races and Toutant set a goal to double the size of the race. The race was able to donate $31,000 to about 30 local charities in 2014.

A number of minor course changes were made for the 2015 race to make the course more spectator-friendly. Toutant assigned Nathan Schaffer as the race's liaison with the University of Wisconsin-Eau Claire. Schaffer attended over 100 meetings in the span of a month to plan university engagement with the marathon, including the Blugolds Athletic Band.

The seventh running of the Eau Claire Marathon took place in 2015. About 3400 runners participated in affiliated races, including 361 who finished the marathon. It was an unseasonably hot year with temperatures above 70 °F (21 °C), despite makeshift solutions such as sprinklers near the old university library at the University of Wisconsin-Eau Claire campus dubbed "Blu's Birdbath." Scotty Hayden won the men's marathon with a time of 2:46:00, while Tammi Braund won the women's marathon with a time of 3:03:46. The Eau Claire Marathon was able to donate about $125,000 to local organizations in 2015.

The eighth running of the Eau Claire Marathon took place in 2016 with 3800 runners participating in affiliated races, including 417 in the marathon. Makoto Westby won the women's race with a time of 3:22:37, while David Luy won the men's race with a time of 2:32:50.

The Eau Claire Marathon had an app for the first time in 2016. Additional minor course changes to the marathon course were made for the 2016 race. In addition, the Eau Claire City Council approved a liquor license for the marathon's post race celebration for the first time after contentious debate. The Eau Claire Police Department has sought to improve the image of Water Street. After the Milwaukee Marathon was short by 0.8 miles (1.3 km) in 2017 and too long in 2016, Toutant assured runners that the Eau Claire Marathon is independently certified and he bikes the route himself to make sure the course is the correct distance and set up correctly on race day.

The ninth running of the Eau Claire Marathon took place in 2017 with slightly more than 4000 runners participating in affiliated events. David Luy won the men's race with a time of 2:25:57, while Margaret Ho won the women's race with a time of 3:08:58. A couple got engaged at the finish line.

The 10th running of the Eau Claire Marathon took place in 2018 with slightly less than 5000 runners participating in affiliated races including 455 in the marathon. David Luy won the men's race with a time of 2:23:09, while Tammi Braund won the women's race with a time of 3:20:39. Before the race, Luy said he hoped to run under 2:19 to qualify for the US Olympic marathon trials. The 2018 event was put on with the help of over 800 volunteers and 41 police officers.

The 11th running of the Eau Claire Marathon took place in 2019 with 5000 runners participating in affiliated races including 700 participating in the marathon. Margaret Ho won the women's race in 2019 with a time of 2:56:23, while Adam Condit won the men's race with a time of 2:40:00. Condit's watch malfunctioned and he threw it to a friend seconds after the start of the race, and Toutant led the crowd in making "moo" sounds at the finish to cheer on Condit. Condit owns a local running store that has a running group, and the group uses moos to cheer each other on.

After the 2019 race, Toutant announced the race would have a new finish line, avoiding Carson Park, going forward pending city approval. Carson Park was problematic because runners disliked the uphill finish and lack of parking, and was not easily accessible to emergency vehicles. On June 25, 2019, the Eau Claire City Council unanimously approved the course change. In 2021, the start and finish location was moved from Carson Park to Phoenix Park and the finish to a location on Graham Avenue.

In 2020, the Eau Claire Marathon was moved from May to September and then moved to a virtual race to avoid the transmission of COVID-19 in light of the COVID-19 pandemic in Wisconsin. The Eau Claire Marathon took similar steps in 2021. It pushed its races from May to September, limited entries to 2000, and had a 25-person rolling start.

The 12th running of the Eau Claire Marathon took place in 2021. Adam Condit won the men's race with a time of 2:38:16, while Rachel Ragona won the women's race with a time of 2:48:31.

As of 2024, Emi Uelmen is the sole owner and race director of the Eau Claire Marathon.

In April 2024, the Eau Claire Police Department purchased a Polaris Ranger XP 1000 utility task vehicle saying it was necessary for large events such as the Eau Claire Marathon. The Firehouse Subs Public Safety Foundation awarded the Eau Claire Police a $33,238.94 grant to make this acquisition.

Beginning in 2024, participants who ran the Get In Gear Half Marathon (in Saint Paul and Minneapolis, Minnesota) on Saturday and Eau Claire Half Marathon on Sunday would receive a "Half & Half Challenge" medal.

== Cultural impact ==
In 2012, the University of Wisconsin-Eau Claire Alumni Association honored Dan and Debbie Market for involving the University of Wisconsin-Eau Claire women's basketball team in service-learning opportunities such as the Eau Claire Marathon. As of 2013, Debbie Market led a group of student volunteers to run a themed water station along the race course. Also in the same year, Tom O'Leary the cross country coach from Byron, Minnesota ran the Eau Claire Marathon.

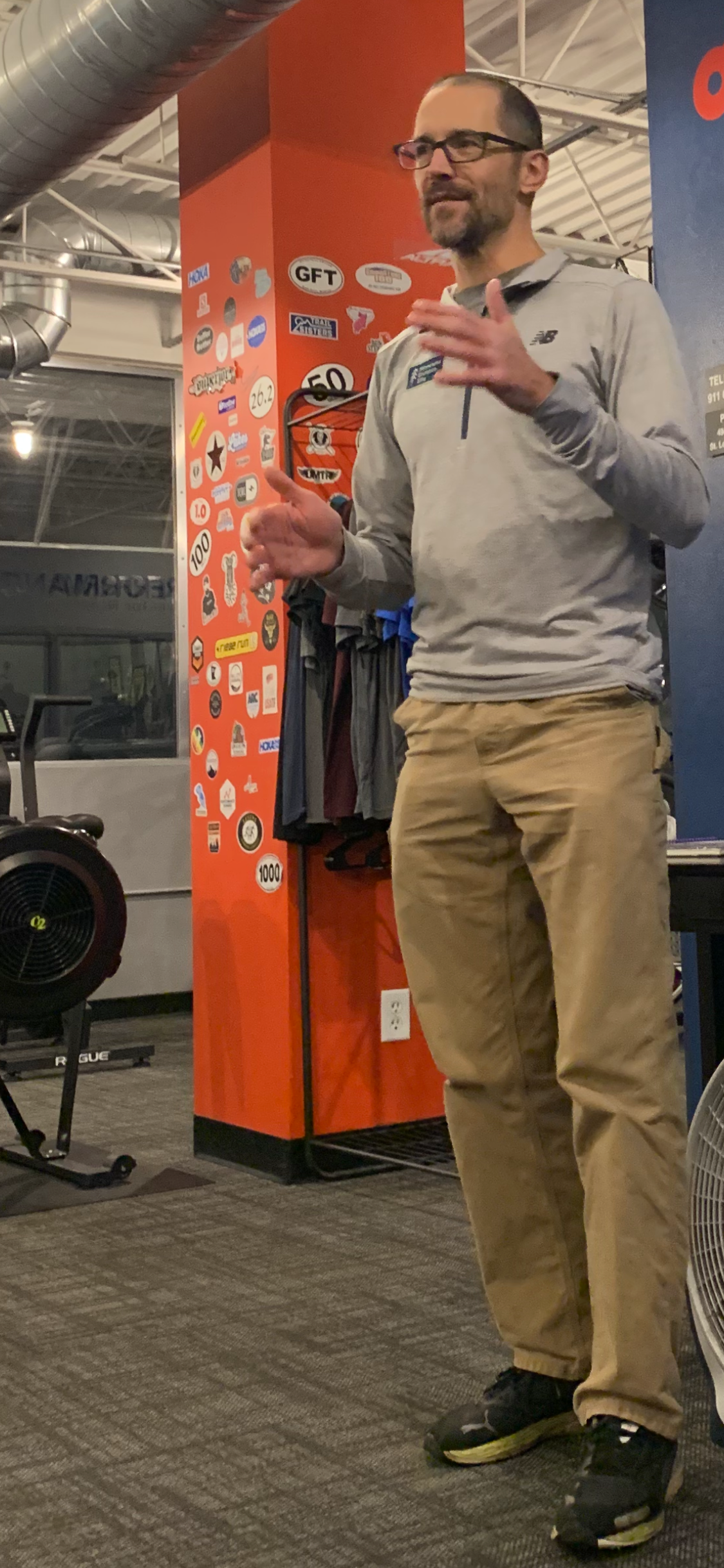
Chris Lundstrom in December 2024

Chris Lundstrom and Dr. Stacy Ingram at the University of Minnesota started a kinesiology class in which 40% of the final grade is completing the Eau Claire Marathon. A total of 105 students in the class participated in the 2014 Eau Claire Marathon. A similar class, entitled Distance Running for Health and Fitness, was offered by Dr. Matt Evans at the University of Wisconsin-Eau Claire in 2015, which was inspired by the class offered by the University of Minnesota. The University of Wisconsin-Eau Claire course incorporates adult continuing education students as well. As of 2025, Ben Anderson and Kara Johnson were teaching the course.

Wisconsin Governor Scott Walker wore a "Run EC" hat promoting the Eau Claire Marathon while touring the state in 2016. The Wisconsin Department of Tourism awarded the Eau Claire Marathon a $39,500 marketing grant in 2021 to help grow the economic impact of nonprofit events.

In 2022, Eau Claire Tours released an audio tour of Eau Claire sports history that features the Eau Claire Marathon.

In 2023, the Speck of Dust Theatre Company aimed to put on plays created within 24 hours and performed such a play featuring Eau Claire Marathon runners who attempted to cheat by cutting the course and inadvertently got stuck in a time loop.

== Past marathon results ==
Year	Men's winner	Time (h:m:s)	Women's winner	Time (h:m:s)
1982	Randy Schultz	2:43:07	Pamela Jones	3:36:42
1983	Barney Klecker	2:36:00	Sherry Stubler	3:31:11
1984	Barney Klecker	2:28:51	Cindy Spaeth	3:39:59
1985	Barney Klecker	2:31:41	Paula Hinke	3:27:53
2009	Patrick Russel	2:34:03	Heather Lipinski	3:19:25
2010	Jessop Keene	3:01:55	Wendy Miller	3:12:18
2011	Patrick Russell	2:50:59	Lisa Tavares	3:21:51
2012	Patrick Russell	2:36:17	April Cole	3:12:06
2013	Scott Hayden	2:36:51	Sarah McCall	3:15:00
2014	Eric Glaubke	2:45:06	Kristin Weinzierl	3:09:16
2015	Scotty Hayden	2:46:00	Tammi Braund	3:03:46
2016	David Luy	2:32:50	Makoto Westby	3:22:37
2017	David Luy	2:25:57	Margaret Ho	3:08:58
2018	David Luy	2:23:09	Tammi Braund	3:20:39
2019	Adam Condit	2:40:00	Margaret Ho	2:56:23
2021	Adam Condit	2:38:16	Rachel Ragona	2:48:31
2022	Hayden Fredrickson	2:31:42	Rachel Ragona	2:52:16
2023	Dylan Ponomar	2:35:39	Margaret Ho	3:01:33
2024	Brett Noecker	2:26:59	Lanea Bartel	2:54:54
2025	Michael Walentiny	2:36:11	Andrine Larsen	2:58:00
2026	David Bachmeier	2:30:27	Chloe Whalen	3:17:30

== Past half marathon results ==
Year	Men's winner	Time (h:m:s)	Women's winner	Time (h:m:s)
2010	Wynn Davis	1:13:11	Anja Jokela	1:30:50
2011	Chris Wirtz	1:15:45	Erin Manlove	1:27:51
2012	Cory Hayden	1:11:12	Mary Palmer	1:27:27
2013	Cory Hayden	1:09:44	Andrea Simon	1:27:42
2014	Cory Hayden	1:10:12	Jennifer Chapman	1:31:40
2015	Cory Hayden	1:10:47	Steph Sjostrom	1:32:29
2016	Kevin Hall	1:11:09	Mary Wirtz	1:23:42
2017	Brent Kann	1:10:58	Rebekka Dow	1:25:30
2018	Brent Kann	1:12:44	Stephanie Cloutier	1:25:20
2019	David Luy	1:09:28	Lucy Ramquist	1:22:26
2021	Riley Huffman	1:14:21	Emily Person	1:27:41
2022	Daniel Docherty	1:10:28	Jackie Hering	1:15:48
2023	Daniel Docherty	1:09:44	Erin Moldenhauer	1:22:37
2024	David Fassbender	1:08:26	Rachel Werking	1:19:28
2025	Eric Mann	1:10:08	Lexie Hille	1:24:33
2026	Daniel Docherty	1:07:14	Sam Cooper	1:23:46
