= Eau Claire River =

Eau Claire River is the name of several rivers in North America, including:

- Three rivers in Wisconsin in the United States:
  - Eau Claire River (Chippewa River tributary), a tributary of the Chippewa River
  - Eau Claire River (St. Croix River tributary), a tributary of the St. Croix River (Wisconsin-Minnesota)
  - Eau Claire River (Wisconsin River tributary), a tributary of the Wisconsin River

== See also ==
- Eau Claire (disambiguation)
