= Augusta Wildlife Area =

State Wildlife Area in Eau Claire County, Wisconsin

- Augusta State Wildlife Area
- IUCN category V (protected landscape/seascape)
- Location within Wisconsin Location within the United States
- Location: Eau Claire County, Wisconsin
- Nearest city: Augusta, WI
- Coordinates: 44°43′31″N 91°5′18″W
- Area: 2,503 acres (10.13 km^{2})
- Established: 1942
- Governing body: Wisconsin Department of Natural Resources

The Augusta Wildlife Area is a tract of protected land located in Eau Claire County, Wisconsin, managed by the Wisconsin Department of Natural Resources (WDNR). The land to be used for the Wildlife Area was first acquired in 1942, and the land contained within it has grown from 2,020 acres (820 ha) to the 2,503 acres (1,013 ha) that it is now, with an ultimate goal of controlling 2,640 acres (1,070 ha). The Wildlife Area falls within the bounds of both the Western Coulee and Ridges Ecological Landscape and the Central Sand Plains Ecological Landscape.

== Flora and Fauna ==
There are several different types of trees in the Wildlife Area, including white pine, red pine, aspen, jack pine and red maple.

Tree cover type acreage
Cover type	Acres	Percentage cover
Aspen	362	32%
Jack pine	144	13%
Miscellaneous	94	8%
Oak	394	34%
Red maple/central hardwoods	103	9%
White pine	52	4%
Total acreage	1,149	100%

Besides trees, there are many other notable flora to be found within the boundaries of the Wildlife Area, such as reed canary grass, cattails, blue flag iris, sphagnum moss and bur-reed.

The area was founded in part to provide for the production of geese and ducks, and as such there is a sizable population of both in the Wildlife Area. In addition to the various waterfowl that are found in the area,(such as the green-winged teal and American Wigeon) bears, deer, cottontail rabbits, coyotes, otters and sandhill cranes have also been observed in the area.

== See also ==
- Eau Claire Dam
- Geography of Wisconsin
