= Barney Klecker =

American ultramarathon runner

Barney Klecker (born August 25, 1951) is the United States former record holder for the 50 mile ultramarathon, finishing with a time of four hours fifty one minutes and twenty five seconds. This record was set on October 5, 1980, at the AMJA Ultramarathon in Chicago, Illinois. Klecker is a two-time champion of the City of Lakes Marathon/Twin Cities Marathon (1977, 1979) and the Edmund Fitzgerald 100 km (1982, 1986). He was also the winner of the first two runnings of the Tallahassee Ultradistance Classic (1982, 1983). Klecker won the 1978 Grandma's Marathon in a time of 2:18.42.

Klecker married Janis Horns, another runner from Minnesota who later competed in the marathon at the 1992 Summer Olympics as Janis Klecker. Barney Klecker was and Janis Klecker is an American record holder in the 50 K.

Klecker ran track and cross country at the University of Wisconsin–Stout, the "Blue Devils." Barney has 6 children, including Joe Klecker.

Barney Klecker won the 1984 Eau Claire Marathon with a time of 2:28:51 despite starting late.

== Achievements ==
- All results regarding marathon, unless stated otherwise

Year	Competition	Venue	Position	Notes
Representing the United States
1978	Grandma's Marathon	Duluth, United States	1st	2:18:42
