= Phoenix Park (Eau Claire, Wisconsin) =

Coordinates: 44.81281°N 91.50357°W

Phoenix Park is a public space in downtown Eau Claire, Wisconsin, located on a former brownfield site at the confluence of the Chippewa River and the Eau Claire River. It covers approximately 9 acres with approximately 1/2 mile of riverbank frontage. The park serves as the trailhead for the Chippewa River State Trail. The park also offers a walking labyrinth, a natural amphitheater, and is home to Eau Claire's year-round farmer's market. These amenities make Phoenix Park a major gathering spot, especially during the summer months when the park plays hosts to concerts. The park is owned and operated by the City of Eau Claire.

== History ==
Completed in 2005, the park is named for the former Phoenix Steel Company (previously Phoenix Manufacturing Company) that resided on a majority of the site (along the Chippewa River frontage) since 1875. Phoenix Steel vacated the site in 1971, and subsequently leased the building for warehousing and storage. In 1981 the city of Eau Claire took ownership of the tax-delinquent site with the intent of eliminating the blight influences of the property. Despite the listing of the industrial buildings in the National Register of Historic Places in 1983, the buildings were demolished per the city's plan in 1985. In 1994 the city and Wisconsin Department of Natural Resources worked jointly to remediate the soil contamination from almost a century of industrial operations. The remainder of the brownfield on the Eau Claire River frontage, owned by Northern States Power (later Xcel Energy), was remediated in 2002. The purchase of the land by the city of Eau Claire was aided by the Knowles-Nelson Stewardship Fund, a state of Wisconsin fund for conservation, recreation, and waterfront development. The construction of the park was funded through a mix of Federal funding and Eau Claire Tax Incremental District #8, created to eliminate blight in the downtown area.
