= Leader-Telegram =

Newspaper in Eau Claire, Wisconsin

- Type: Daily newspaper
- Owner: Adams MultiMedia
- Publisher: Paul Gaier
- Editor: Matt Milner
- Founded: 1881
- Headquarters: 701 S. Farwell St, Eau Claire, WI
- Circulation: 14,034 (as of 2022)
- Website: leadertelegram.com

The Leader-Telegram is a daily newspaper published in Eau Claire, Wisconsin, by Adams MultiMedia. It was founded in 1881 and is read throughout Eau Claire County and surrounding counties.

The Buckshot Run is named after Leader-Telegram sports-writer Ron Buckli.

== History ==
Adams Publishing acquired the Leader-Telegram from the Graaskamp and Atkinson families, which had owned the paper since 1887.

As of 2013, the paper has a daily circulation of nearly 30,000 during the week and a circulation rate of nearly 40,000 for the Sunday paper.

== See also ==
- List of newspapers in Wisconsin
