= Buckshot Run =

American road race

- Date: late August or early September
- Location: Eau Claire, Wisconsin
- Event type: Paved Road
- Distance: 5 miles (8.0 km) and 2 miles (3.2 km)
- Established: 1983
- Participants: over 300

The Buckshot Run, previously the Leader-Telegram Buckshot Run, is an annual 5 miles (8.0 km) and 2 miles (3.2 km) race held in Eau Claire, Wisconsin, held on Labor Day weekend. It was established in 1983 and attracts runners of all varieties. It is named after Leader-Telegram sports-writer Ron Buckli. It was run to raise money for the Indianhead Special Olympics, however the 2024 running was the last affiliated with the Special Olympics. As of 2022, the race raised an estimated $1.5 million.

The race starts and finishes at Carson Park and follows the Chippewa River State Trail in Eau Claire, Wisconsin.

Bob Lesniewski had the idea of a run to support the Special Olympics, and the first running on September 3, 1983 drew 412 participants. The first running had a $5 entry fee and raised $1100 for the Special Olympics. The race shirts for the first year were green and said "Get your Tail into the Mousetrap" because Greg "Mouse" Bement was the race's first sponsor and held a post race party at his bar. Lesniewski invited Dan Conway to run it as a show-case runner. The following year, Dick Beardsley ran and won the Buckshot Run in the same year as his fabled Boston Marathon duel with Alberto Salazar.

Mike Salm previously served as race director of the Buckshot Run.

The 2015 race was run in honor of Brian Amundson who was a regular at the race. Amundson, a former city engineer from 1986 to 1996, had permanent mile markers installed in the pavement along the five-mile race course in 2002.

As of 2019, Mai Xiong and Michaela Harrison were responsible for putting on the Buckshot Run.

Beginning in 2019, the five mile race was named the Dan Conway 5 Mile in honor of Dan Conway who won the first Buckshot Run in 1983. Conway lived in Superior, Wisconsin, and was a coach in Chetek, Wisconsin. In 2014, Conway ran the race in a tuxedo in what he said was going to be his last Buckshot Run after having participated 30 times over the race's 31 years.

The 2022 race was run in honor of Maynard Faanes. Greg Faanes had run in all 40 Buckshot Runs as of 2022 along with Dave Oestreich, Terry Hayden, Jerry Poling, Pat Callahan and Gary Ellis.

Bob Lesniewski, founder of the Buckshot Run, called it a predecessor of the Eau Claire Marathon by popularizing distance running in the region.
