= Carson Park (Eau Claire, Wisconsin) =

Park in Eau Claire, Wisconsin, US

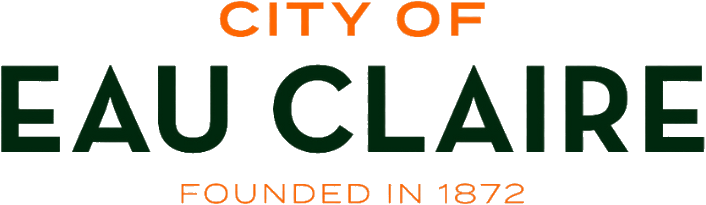

- Location within Wisconsin
- Location: Eau Claire, Wisconsin
- Coordinates: 44°48′29″N 91°31′16″W
- Opened: 1915; 111 years ago
- Owner: City of Eau Claire
- Website: visiteauclaire.com/carsonpark

Carson Park is a historic park located in Eau Claire, Wisconsin. It is located on a 134-acre (54.2 ha) peninsula created on an oxbow lake, Half Moon Lake, which was part of the former course of the Chippewa River. The park contains baseball, football, and softball venues, as well as the Chippewa Valley Museum.

== History ==
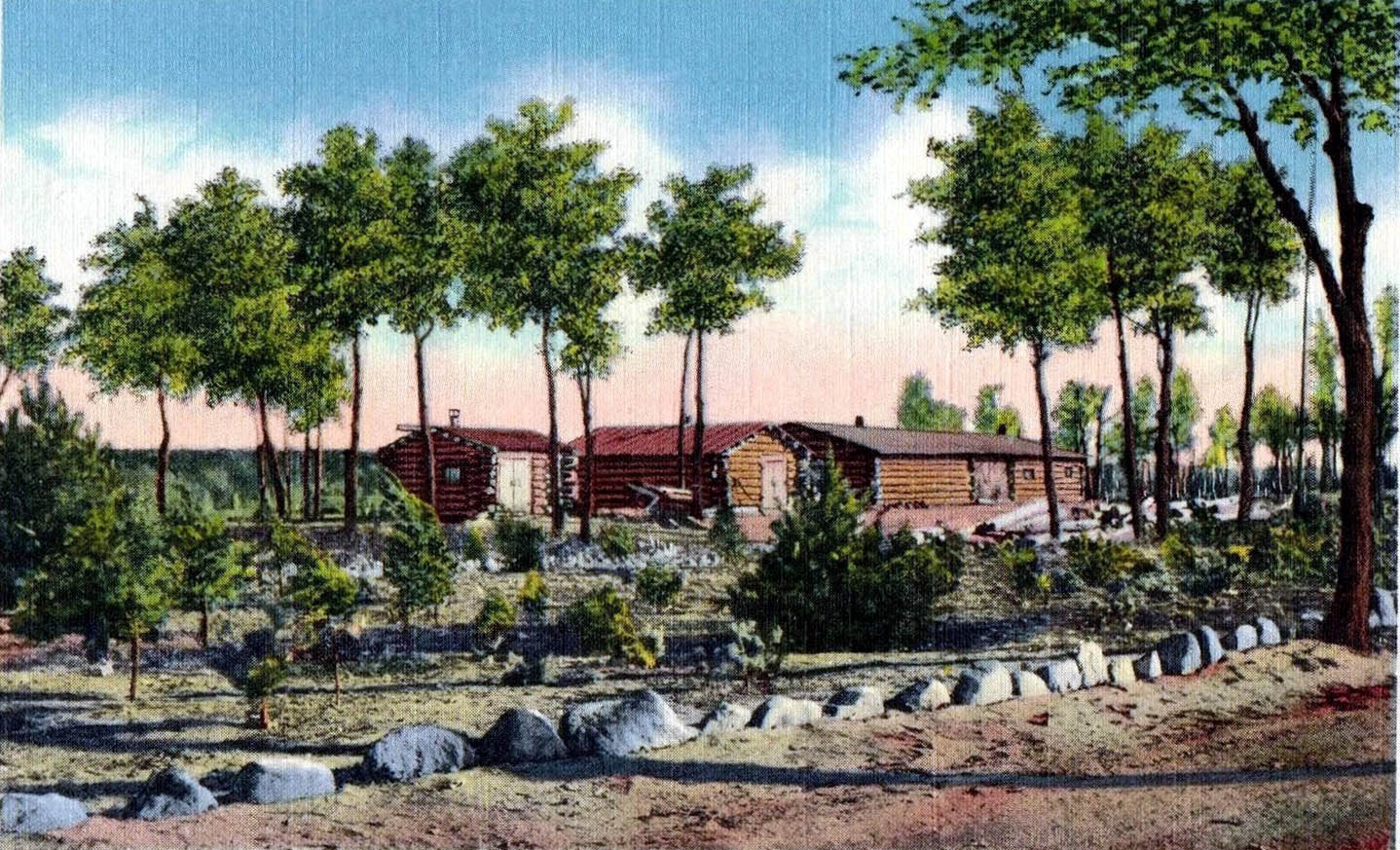
Some cabins on the park displayed on a 1938 postcard

The land that became Carson Park was donated in 1914 to the city of Eau Claire by heirs to lumber baron William Carson, and named in his honor. The park was opened the following year.

Construction of a sports complex, including a baseball stadium, football stadium and tennis courts, began in 1935 as a Works Progress Administration (WPA) project. The first game in the football stadium was played in 1936, and the first game in the baseball stadium was played in 1937.

The baseball stadium was added to the National Register of Historic Places in 2003.

== Baseball stadium ==
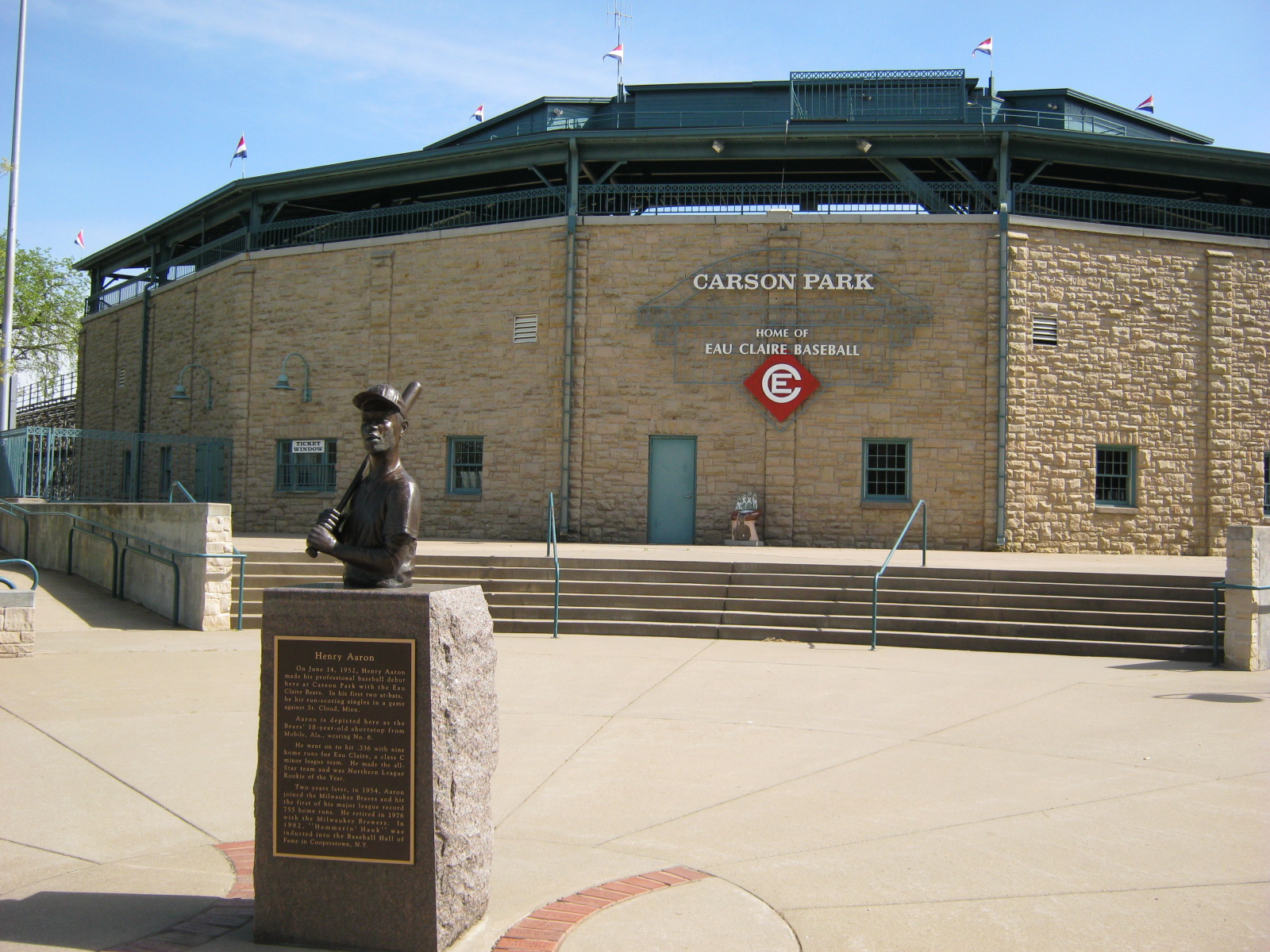
Main entrance to the baseball stadium

The Carson Park baseball stadium hosts the Memorial (Old Abes), North (Huskies), Regis (Ramblers) and Immanuel Lutheran (Lancers) high school teams; the Eau Claire Express of the Northwoods League; the Eau Claire Cavaliers and Eau Claire Bears amateur teams; and the Eau Claire Pizza Hut American Legion team.

The left field wall is adjacent to the sideline of the Carson Park football stadium field. During the football season, temporary bleachers from the baseball stadium are positioned on left field with the front of the bleachers placed along the left field wall facing the football field.

For the 2025 Eau Claire Express season, a 36' by 20' Daktronics video board (known as the "WNB Financial Video Board") was installed in the outfield scoreboard location.

== Football stadium ==
Carson Park (football stadium)
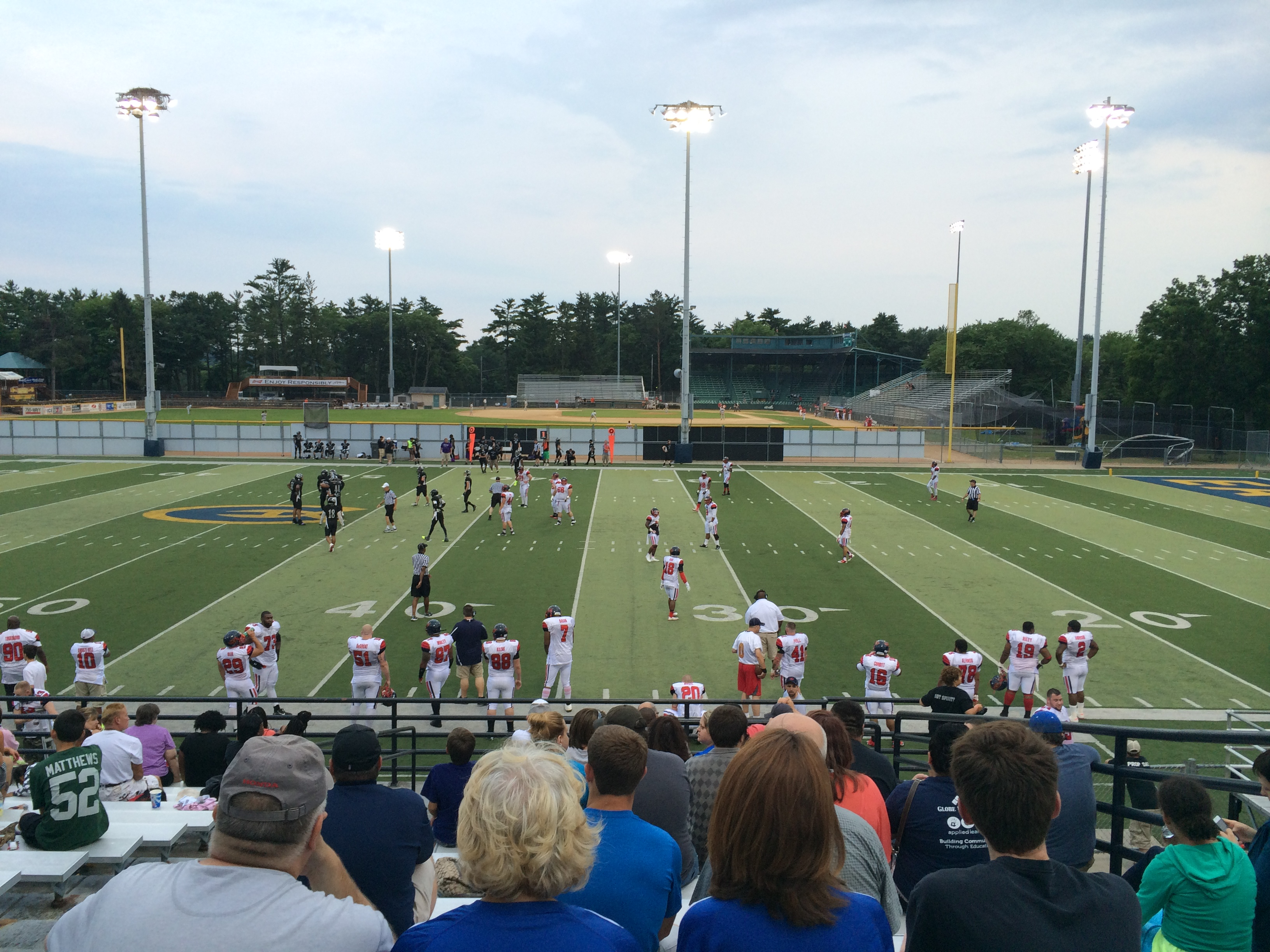
- The stadium during a game in 2014
- Interactive map of Carson Park (football stadium)
- Location: One Carson Park Drive; Eau Claire, Wisconsin 54701
- Coordinates: 44°48′32″N 91°31′12″W
- Capacity: 6,500
- Surface: Natural grass (1936–2003), FieldTurf (2004–present)

Construction
- Opened: 1936; 90 years ago
- Cost: $60,000

Tenants
- UWEC Blugolds (1937–present); Chippewa Valley Predators (2005–2017); Eau Claire Crush (2007–2014)

Carson Park's football stadium is home of the University of Wisconsin–Eau Claire Blugolds, as well as the Regis football team. It was the home of Memorial and North High Schools through the 2024 season. It also hosted the now-defunct Chippewa Valley Predators and Eau Claire Crush of the amateur Northern Elite Football League.

The UW–Eau Claire Blugold football team began play in the stadium in 1937. A tornado that moved through Eau Claire on September 12, 1982, destroyed the press box at the football stadium. A larger, multi-level press box was constructed in the same location. A renovation to the football stadium's grandstand and separate concession/bathroom facilities took place in the late 1990s.

As more teams used the football field, the condition of the field deteriorated. Beginning in the 1990s, the city attempted several alternative natural grass fields. A solution came in 2004 with the installation of a FieldTurf artificial surface. New turf was again installed in 2015.

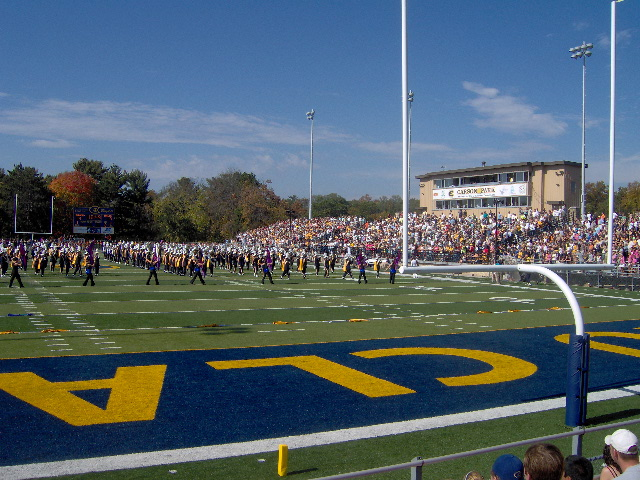
Stadium's end zone

== Additional venues ==
The park has two museums. The Paul Bunyan Logging Camp Museum, which opened in 1934, portrays the town's lumbering history and contains seven authentic logging camp buildings. The Chippewa Valley Museum, opened in 1974, serves as a regional history museum. It contains an old-fashioned ice cream parlor; the one-room Sunnyview School, dating to 1882; and the Anderson Log House, a Norwegian log house built in about 1866, which are situated next to the museum in Carson Park.

The park also has nature trails and offers other recreational activities. Half Moon Lake is the original home of the Eau Claire Ski Sprites, a water skiing show team, and the Eau Claire Horseshoe Club.

Carson Park displayed the historic locomotive Soo Line 2719 from 1960 to 1996. From Memorial Day through Labor Day, the Chippewa Valley Railroad Association operates the one-half mile, 16 in (406 mm) gauge Chippewa Valley Railroad, a ridable miniature railway excursion in the park.

The Buckshot Run starts and finishes at Carson Park and follows the Chippewa River State Trail in Eau Claire, Wisconsin.
