= Chippewa River State Trail =

State Trail in western Wisconsin

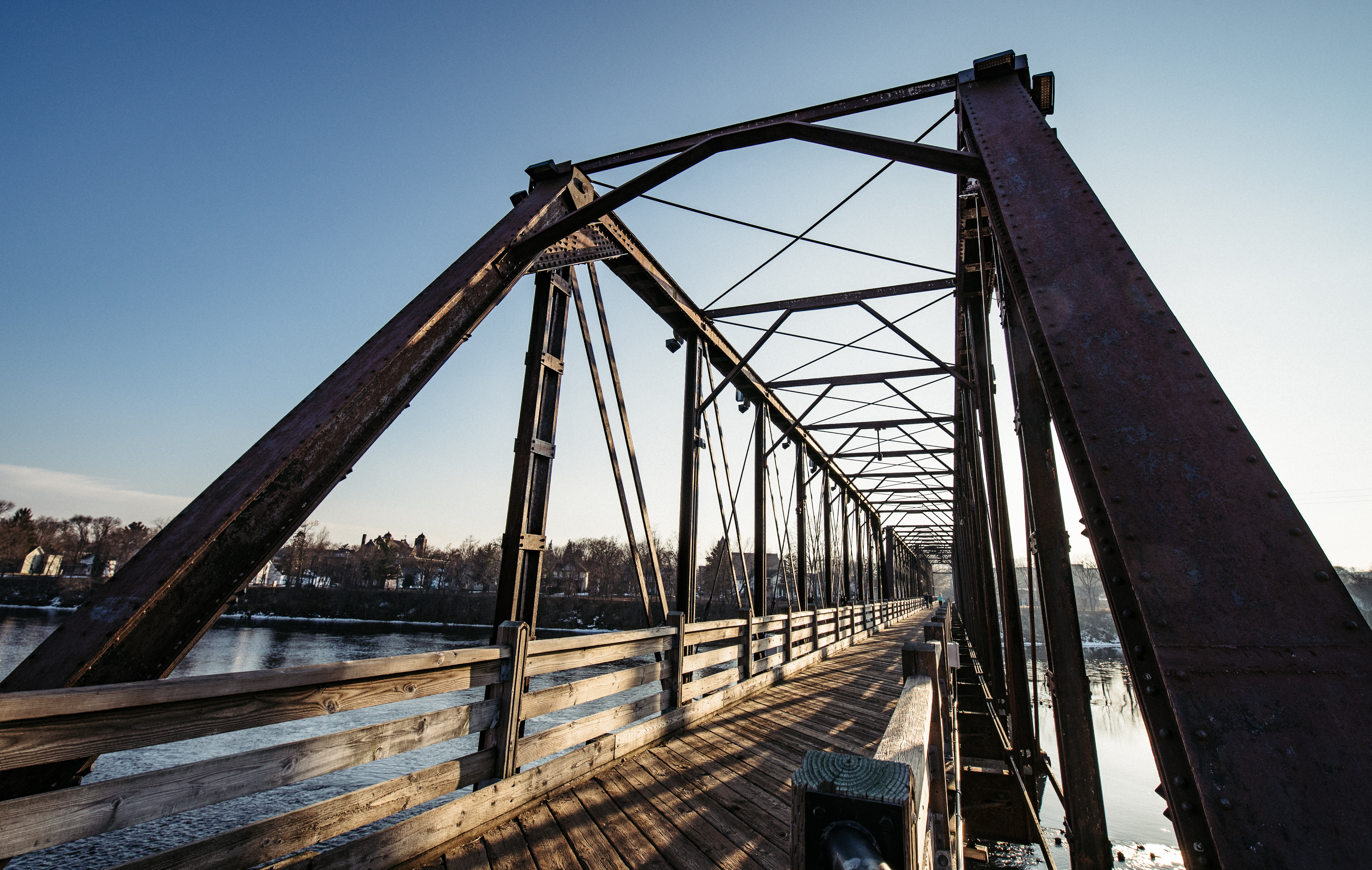
- Phoenix Park Trail Bridge is part of the Chippewa River State Trail in Eau Claire
- Length: 26 mi (42 km)
- Location: Wisconsin, USA
- Designation: multi-use
- Trailheads: Eau Claire, Wisconsin and Durand, Wisconsin
- Difficulty: easy
- Surface: crushed limestone
- Maintained by: Wisconsin Department of Natural Resources

Trail map
- Map

Chippewa River State Trail is a 26-mile urban-rural rail trail in western Wisconsin that follows the path of the Chippewa River. The trails runs from the spot of the confluence of the Chippewa with the Eau Claire River, at Phoenix Park in downtown Eau Claire (44°48′48″N 91°30′16″W), meeting up with the Red Cedar State Trail near Red Cedar (44°42′03″N 91°52′12″W), to Durand (44°37′53″N 91°57′47″W). A former railroad corridor, the trail passes through a variety of habitat including wetlands, prairies and sandstone bluff.

The Chippewa River State Trail will eventually be part of the greater Chippewa River Trail System which also includes the Red Cedar State Trail and the Old Abe State Trail. Once completed, the system will include almost 70 miles (110 km) of trail and connect the cities of Durand, Menomonie, Chippewa Falls, Eau Claire and Cornell. As of 2022, the Red Cedar and Chippewa River Trails connect Eau Claire and Menomonie, but there is no trail between Eau Claire and Chippewa Falls.

The trail is also connected with several smaller trails within the city of Eau Claire including a walking trail through Putnam Park on the far west side of the park. There is also access to the Farmer's Market in Phoenix Park, which is open on Saturday mornings.

Outside of the city limits of Eau Claire (between Interstate 94 and Durand), there is a fee to use the trail, except for walking and hiking. An annual pass costs $25.00 and a day pass $5.00.
