= Lublin, Wisconsin =

- Village
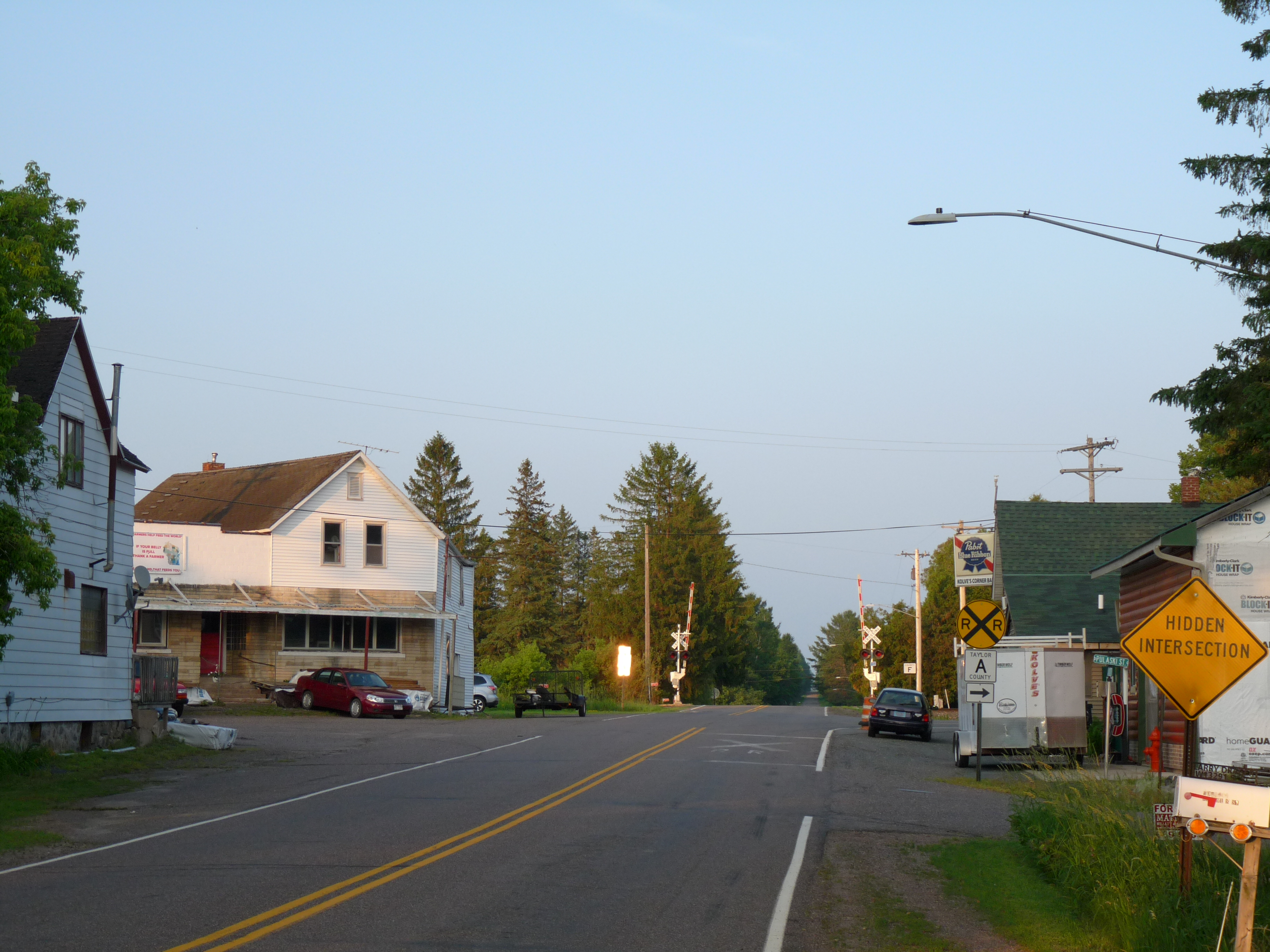
- Lublin's main junction

- Location of Lublin in Taylor County, Wisconsin.
- Coordinates: 45°5′N 90°43′W
- Country: United States
- State: Wisconsin
- County: Taylor

Area
  - Total: 1.53 sq mi (3.95 km^{2})
  - Land: 1.53 sq mi (3.95 km^{2})
  - Water: 0 sq mi (0.00 km^{2})
- Elevation: 1,286 ft (392 m)

Population (2020)
  - Total: 117
  - Density: 76.7/sq mi (29.6/km^{2})
- Time zone: UTC-6 (Central (CST))
  - Summer (DST): UTC-5 (CDT)
- Area codes: 715 & 534
- FIPS code: 55-46150
- GNIS feature ID: 1579782
- Website: http://www.villageoflublin.com

Lublin is a village in Taylor County, Wisconsin, United States. The population was 117 at the 2020 census.

== History ==
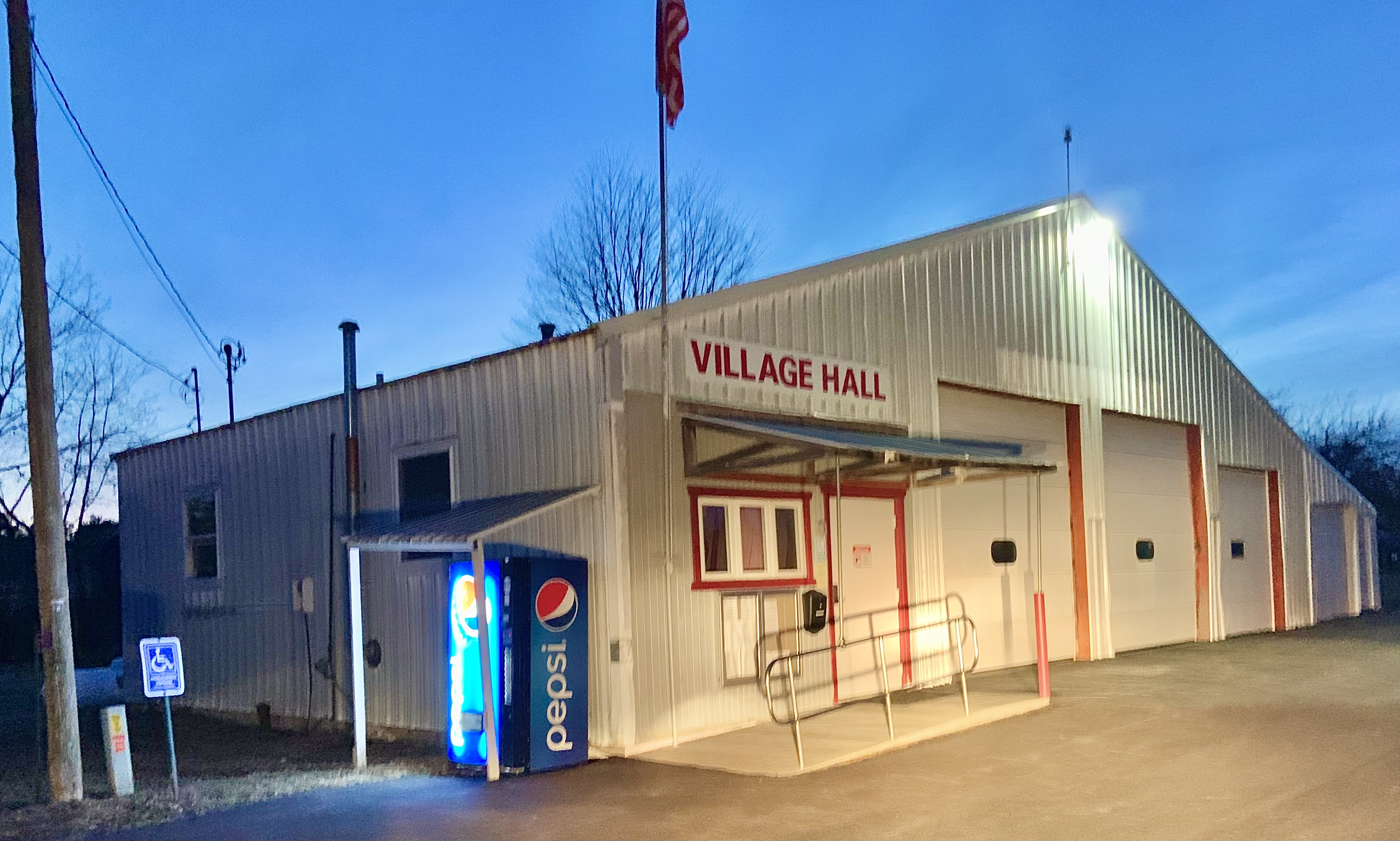
Village hall

U.S. government surveyors walked through the forested area around the future Lublin in 1847 and again in 1854, marking section lines and assessing timber and mill sites.

Loggers followed, with settlers close behind. James O'Neill started his sawmill at what would become Neillsville in 1847, and Michael McAffrey settled in what would become Thorp in 1871. By 1897 the Northwestern Lumber Company's railroad was at Mitterhofer, seven miles west of the future site of Lublin, with a temporary logging spur reaching to a mile south of Lublin, hauling logs out to Northwestern's mill in Stanley. Some of the first settlers in Roosevelt were Konczak, Rajewski, Twardowski, and four Ogurek brothers, who in 1902 bought land from a lumber company and started a sawmill at Whipple Dam four miles southwest of the future site of Lublin. The purchase was facilitated by land agent Marion Durski.

Durski and his family had immigrated from Poland to America in 1887. By 1900 he lived in Chicago, working for Northwestern Lumber. In 1904 or 1905 when the J.S. Owen Company was preparing to build the railroad line from Owen to Ladysmith through what would become Lublin, Durski surveyed a village near where the railroad passed the Eau Claire River. He named the community Lublin, after the city in southeast Poland, and from the start planned a church named All Saints, which would be renamed St. Stanislaus. The 1905 census counted 275 in the town of Roosevelt, with 80% of the heads of household reporting Poland, Poland-Russia, or Poland-Germany as their birthplace.

Land agents other than Durski sold land around Lublin for other land companies. Some were less than honest, assuring the immigrants in their "old country" language that an inexpensive forty in this strange land would easily become a bountiful farm, when the reality was that it would take decades of hard work to untangle fields from stumps and rock.

Things began to happen fast with the arrival of the railroad. Lublin's first school opened in 1906, and was replaced with a larger school a few years later. Several saloons and a general store opened the following year. In 1908 All Saints Catholic and Holy Assumption Orthodox churches were built. The railroad used a box car for a depot until 1911, when it built a permanent depot. A sawmill opened, which converted to a box factory and ran into the 1930s. Over the years the village had a blacksmith, a butcher shop, a hotel/boarding house, a wagon builder, a livery, a harness shop, restaurants, a hardware store, feed mills, grocery stores, a creamery, a bank from 1919 to 1933, a dance hall, the Lublin-Club theater, and other businesses.

Lublin incorporated as a village in 1915, with 236 people. St. Mary's Polish National Catholic church was organized in 1926. Northern States Power Company electrified the village in 1927. By 1930, the Fraternal Order of the Polish Lithuanian Union had 300 dues-paying members.

Lublin's old wooden elementary school burned in the 1950s and was replaced with a two-story brick building, which served the community until the 1970s, when the school was closed and students were bused to Gilman. The town was already shrinking. By 2014 people still worshiped at all three churches, but the businesses had dwindled to not much more than an auto garage, the post office, the Legion/VFW hall, a bar, and a cabin rental business. Canadian-National trains still roar through town on the right-of-way built in 1905.

== Geography ==
According to the United States Census Bureau, the village has a total area of 1.54 square miles (3.99 km^{2}), all land.

== Demographics ==
Historical population
Census	Pop.	Note	%±
1920	209		—
1930	159		−23.9%
1940	148		−6.9%
1950	161		8.8%
1960	160		−0.6%
1970	143		−10.6%
1980	142		−0.7%
1990	129		−9.2%
2000	110		−14.7%
2010	118		7.3%
2020	117		−0.8%
U.S. Decennial Census

=== 2010 census ===
As of the census of 2010, there were 118 people, 57 households, and 30 families living in the village. The population density was 76.6 inhabitants per square mile (29.6/km^{2}). There were 80 housing units at an average density of 51.9 per square mile (20.0/km^{2}). The racial makeup of the village was 98.3% White, 0.8% Asian, and 0.8% from other races. Hispanic or Latino of any race were 0.8% of the population.

There were 57 households, of which 17.5% had children under the age of 18 living with them, 40.4% were married couples living together, 5.3% had a female householder with no husband present, 7.0% had a male householder with no wife present, and 47.4% were non-families. 40.4% of all households were made up of individuals, and 17.6% had someone living alone who was 65 years of age or older. The average household size was 2.07 and the average family size was 2.70.

The median age in the village was 49 years. 16.9% of residents were under the age of 18; 5.1% were between the ages of 18 and 24; 16.9% were from 25 to 44; 34.8% were from 45 to 64; and 26.3% were 65 years of age or older. The gender makeup of the village was 57.6% male and 42.4% female.

=== 2000 census ===
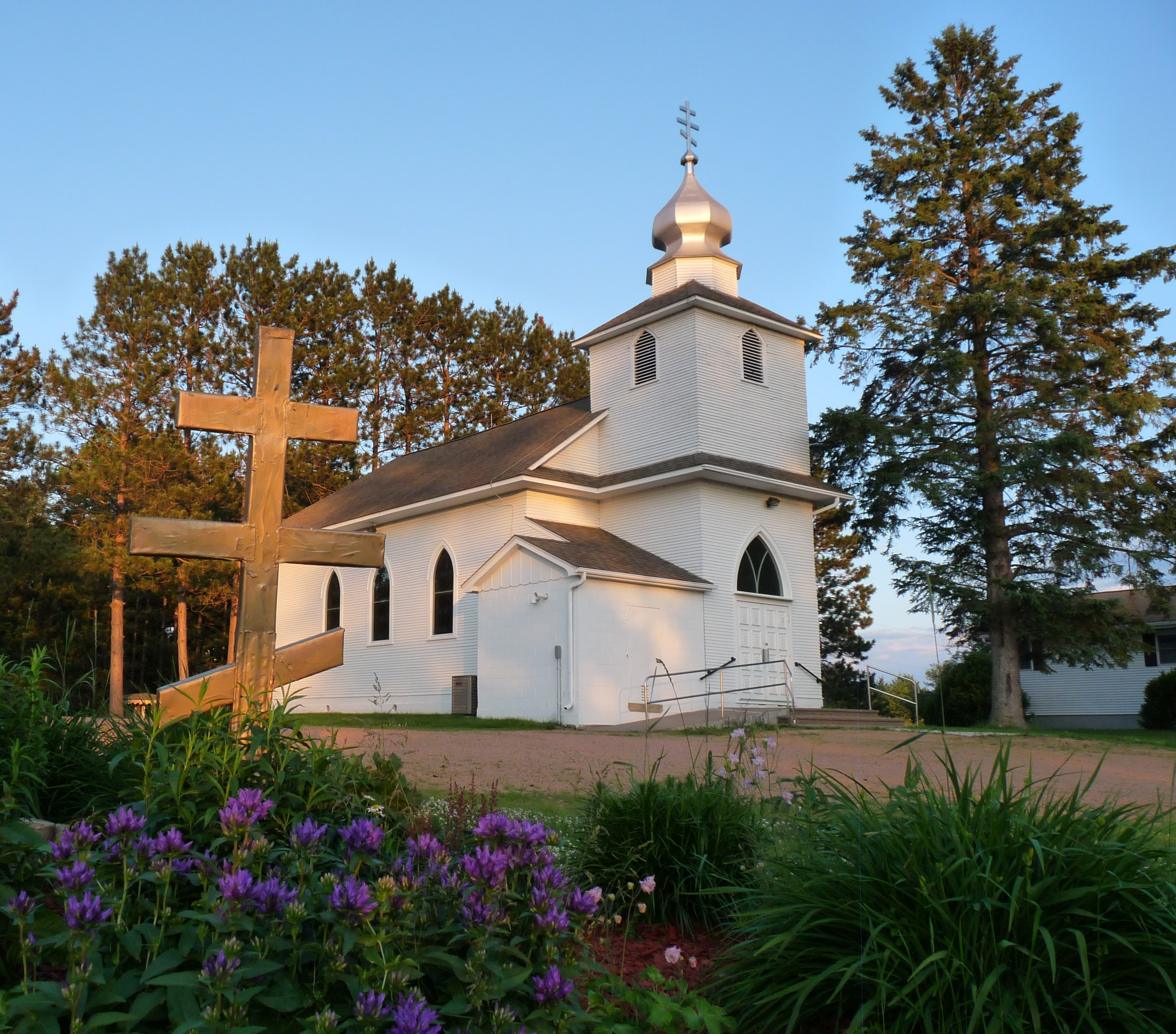
Holy Assumption is an Orthodox church, serving part of Lublin's population with roots in eastern Europe.

As of the census of 2000, there were 110 people, 59 households, and 32 families living in the village. The population density was 72.5 people per square mile (27.9/km^{2}). There were 72 housing units at an average density of 47.5 per square mile (18.3/km^{2}). The racial makeup of the village was 100.00% White.

There were 59 households, out of which 11.9% had children under the age of 18 living with them, 44.1% were married couples living together, 8.5% had a female householder with no husband present, and 44.1% were non-families. 42.4% of all households were made up of individuals, and 18.6% had someone living alone who was 65 years of age or older. The average household size was 1.86 and the average family size was 2.45.

In the village, the population was spread out, with 13.6% under the age of 18, 5.5% from 18 to 24, 23.6% from 25 to 44, 31.8% from 45 to 64, and 25.5% who were 65 years of age or older. The median age was 49 years. For every 100 females, there were 96.4 males. For every 100 females age 18 and over, there were 82.7 males.

The median income for a household in the village was $20,938, and the median income for a family was $50,625. Males had a median income of $28,750 versus $23,750 for females. The per capita income for the village was $15,823. There were 24.1% of families and 27.2% of the population living below the poverty line, including 16.7% of under eighteens and 56.5% of those over 64.

== Notable people ==
- Joseph Sweda, Wisconsin State Representative and farmer, was born in Lublin.
