= Eau Claire River (St. Croix River tributary) =

River in Wisconsin, United States

The Eau Claire River is the northernmost tributary that flows into the St. Croix River. The river is 20 miles long and joins the St. Croix near Gordon in Douglas County, Wisconsin.
