= Eau Claire Dam =

WPA dam in northwestern Wisconsin

Coordinates: 44°45′24″N 91°08′30″W

- Location within Wisconsin Location within the United States
- Country: United States
- Location: Eau Claire County, Wisconsin
- Status: Operational
- Opening date: August 12, 1937

Dam and spillways
- Impounds: Eau Claire River
- Height: 24 ft (7.3 m)
- Length: 251 ft (77 m)

Reservoir
- Creates: Eau Claire Lake
- Total capacity: 17,000 acre⋅ft (21,000,000 m^{3}) max 7,200 acre⋅ft (8,900,000 m^{3}) normal
- Surface area: 1.7 sq mi (4.4 km^{2})
- Normal elevation: 899 ft (274 m)

Eau Claire Dam is a dam in Eau Claire County, Wisconsin, United States.

The concrete gravity dam was dedicated on August 12, 1937, as the result of the largest Depression-era Works Progress Administration project in the entire state. Also known as the Eau Claire River 2WP224 Dam or the Augusta Dam (it stands about six miles north of Augusta, Wisconsin), the dam was developed on the site of the previous "Main River Dam" as a 24 foot (7.3 m) high, 251 foot (77 m) long structure impounding the Eau Claire River.

The reservoir it creates, Eau Claire Lake, has a normal surface area of 1.7 square miles (4.4 km^{2}), with a maximum capacity of 17,000 acre-feet (21,000,000 m^{3}) and normal storage of 7,200 acre-feet (8,900,000 m^{3}). Recreation includes fishing (for musky and walleyed pike), boating and swimming. The county operates two units of its Lake Eau Claire County Park north and south of the lake itself.

The dam is one of several in the Eau Claire – Chippewa Falls metropolitan area on the Eau Claire and Chippewa Rivers. As of 2010, the possibility of developing hydroelectric power at this dam was being investigated.
