= Eau Claire River (Chippewa River tributary) =

River in Eau Claire, Wisconsin

Coordinates: 44°48′42″N 91°30′12″W

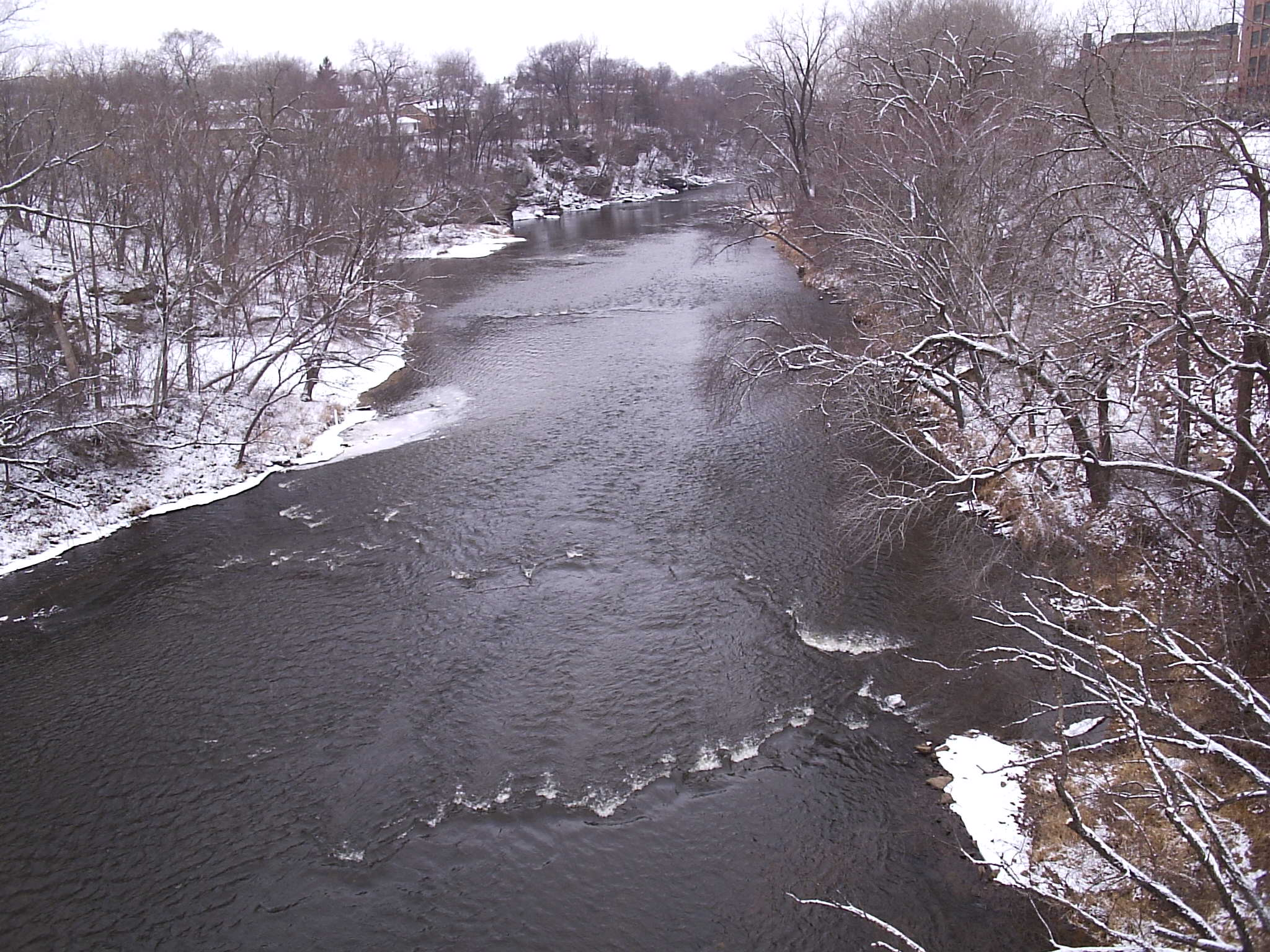
Looking downstream toward downtown Eau Claire, from the footbridge on the east end of Banbury Place, Jan. 31, 2006.

The Eau Claire River is a tributary of the Chippewa River in west-central Wisconsin in the United States. It is one of three rivers by this name in Wisconsin. Via the Chippewa River, it is part of the Mississippi River watershed. Its name is the French translation from the Ojibwe Wayaa-gonaatigweyaa-ziibi (Clear potable-water River).

== Course ==
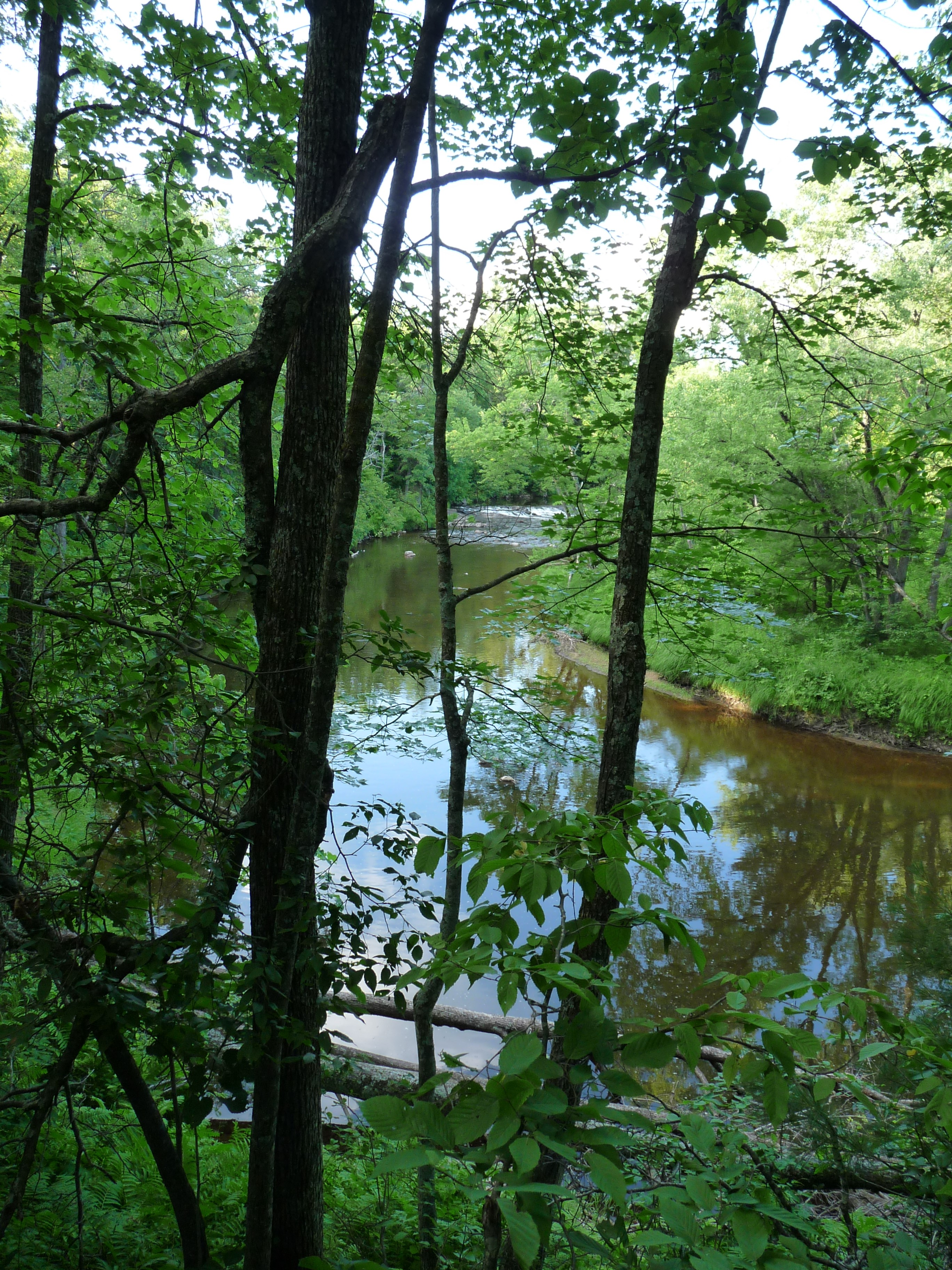
The north fork at Hamilton Falls

The Eau Claire River rises as two streams, the North Fork Eau Claire River and the South Fork Eau Claire River, both of which rise in southwestern Taylor County and flow generally southwestwardly through northeastern Clark and northwestern Eau Claire Counties. The North Fork is about 25 mi (40 km) long and flows past the village of Lublin; it collects the Wolf River in Eau Claire County. The South Fork is about 35 mi (56 km) long.

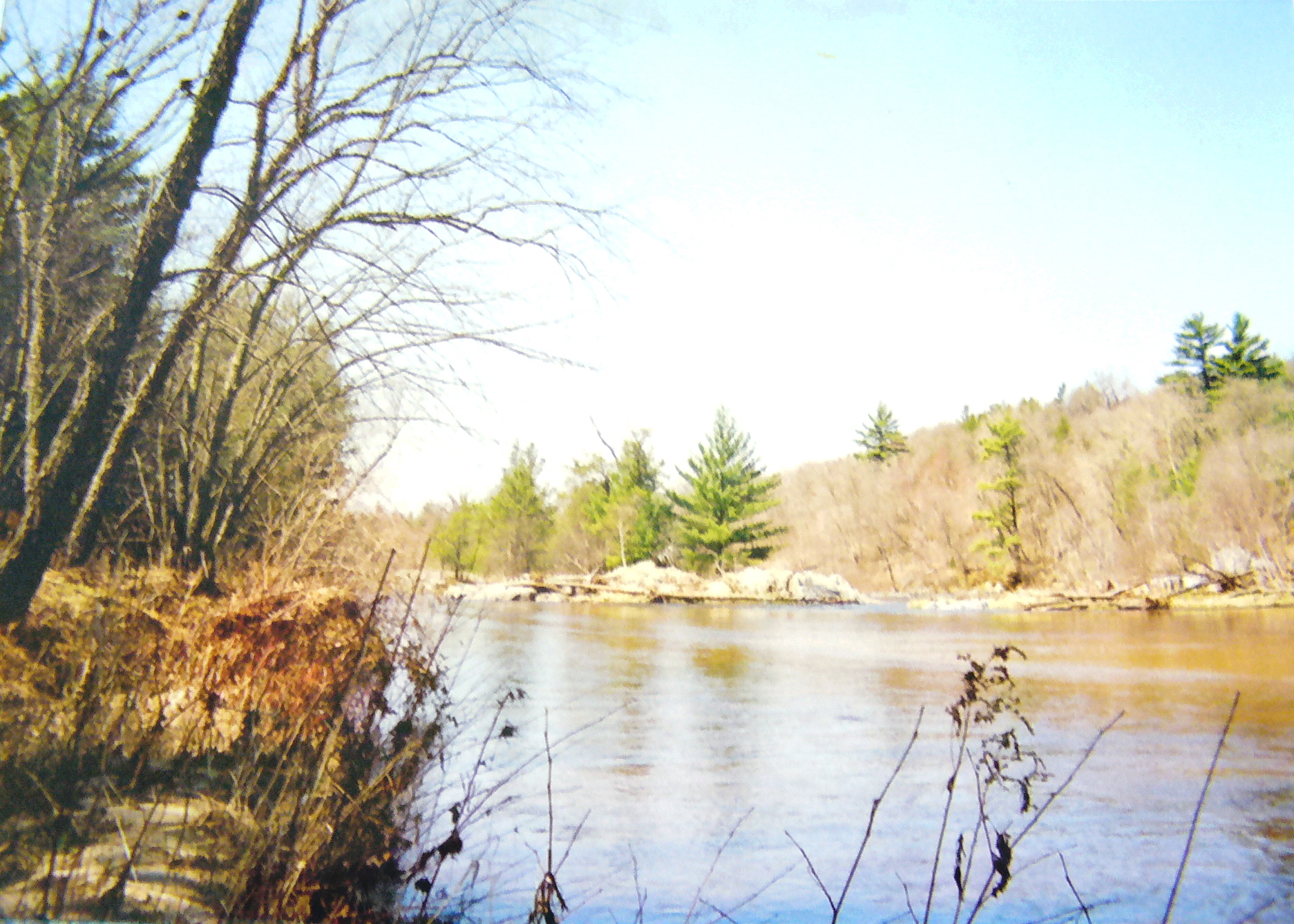
Near Big Falls, in spring.

From the convergence of its headwaters' forks, the Eau Claire River flows generally westwardly through northern Eau Claire County for about 40 mi (64 km), past the city of Altoona to its confluence with the Chippewa River in downtown Eau Claire. Two dams along its course in Eau Claire County cause the river to form two reservoirs: Lake Eau Claire and Lake Altoona. Upstream from Altoona, just north of the village of Fall Creek, the river passes over a waterfall known as Big Falls, which is the site of a county park.

== Cultural information ==
Eau Claire River (named the "Clear Water River, a branch of the Chippewa") serves in part as the boundary between the Chippewa and Winnebago people in an 1825 treaty, and as a southern boundary for the 1837 Treaty-ceded Territory, where the signatory Ojibwe bands may hunt, fish and gather to maintain their cultural livelihood.

== See also ==
- List of Wisconsin rivers
- See Logging on the Chippewa for an overview of 19th century logging in the Chippewa watershed.
