= First United Methodist Church =

First United Methodist Church may refer to:

== Alabama ==
- First United Methodist Church (Birmingham, Alabama)
- Eufaula First United Methodist Church
- First United Methodist Church (Jasper, Alabama)
- First United Methodist Church (Wetumpka, Alabama)

== Arkansas ==
- First United Methodist Church (Conway, Arkansas)
- First United Methodist Church (DeWitt, Arkansas)
- First United Methodist Church (Fordyce, Arkansas)
- First United Methodist Church (Forrest City, Arkansas)
- First United Methodist Church (Hamburg, Arkansas)
- First United Methodist Church (Little Rock, Arkansas)
- First United Methodist Church (Lockesburg, Arkansas)
- First United Methodist Church (Searcy, Arkansas)

== Florida ==
- First United Methodist Church (Jasper, Florida)
- First United Methodist Church (Kissimmee, Florida)
- First United Methodist Church of Orlando
- First United Methodist Church of St. Petersburg, Florida

== Georgia ==
- Atlanta First United Methodist Church
- First Methodist Church (Douglas, Georgia)
- Suwanee First United Methodist Church

== Idaho ==
- First United Methodist Church (Coeur d'Alene, Idaho)
- Cathedral of the Rockies First United Methodist Church, Boise

== Illinois ==
- First United Methodist Church of Chicago
- First United Methodist Church (Peoria, Illinois)

== Iowa ==
- First United Methodist Church (Chariton, Iowa)
- First United Methodist Church (Des Moines, Iowa)

== Kentucky ==
- First United Methodist Church (Catlettsburg, Kentucky)
- First United Methodist Church (Louisa, Kentucky)
- First United Methodist Church (Paintsville, Kentucky)
- First United Methodist Church (Prestonburg, Kentucky)

== Louisiana ==
- First United Methodist Church (Columbia, Louisiana)
- First United Methodist Church (DeRidder, Louisiana)
- First United Methodist Church (Lafayette, Louisiana)
- First United Methodist Church (Leesville, Louisiana)
- First United Methodist Church (New Iberia, Louisiana)
- First United Methodist Church (Shreveport, Louisiana)
- First United Methodist Church (West Monroe, Louisiana)

== Maryland ==
- First United Methodist Church (Laurel, Maryland)

== Michigan ==
- First United Methodist Church (Farmington, Michigan)
- First United Methodist Church (Highland Park, Michigan)

== Nebraska ==
- First United Methodist Church (Nebraska City, Nebraska)

== Nevada ==
- First United Methodist Church (Reno, Nevada)

== New York ==
- First United Methodist Church (Gloversville, New York)
- First United Methodist Church (Ilion, New York)
- First United Methodist Church (Mount Vernon, New York)
- Asbury First United Methodist Church, Rochester

== North Carolina ==
- First United Methodist Church (Lincolnton, North Carolina)

== Ohio ==
- First United Methodist Church (Elyria, Ohio)
- Franklin First United Methodist Church
- First United Methodist Church (London, Ohio)
- First United Methodist Church (Salem, Ohio)
- First United Methodist Church (Woodsfield, Ohio)

== Oklahoma ==
- First United Methodist Church of Drumright
- First United Methodist Church (Fairview, Oklahoma), a National Register of Historic Places listing in Major County, Oklahoma
- First United Methodist Church (Walters, Oklahoma)

== Oregon ==
- Salem First United Methodist Church

== South Dakota ==
- First United Methodist Church (Aberdeen, South Dakota)

== Tennessee ==
- First United Methodist Church of Columbia
- First United Methodist Church (Humboldt, Tennessee)

== Texas ==
- First United Methodist Church (Crockett, Texas), a National Register of Historic Places listing in Houston County, Texas
- First United Methodist Church (Dallas, Texas)
- First Methodist Church (Midland, Texas)
- First United Methodist Church (Paris, Texas)
- First United Methodist Church (San Marcos, Texas)
- First United Methodist Church (Waco, Texas)

== Washington ==
- First United Methodist Church (Seattle)

== Wyoming ==
- First United Methodist Church (Buffalo, Wyoming)
- First United Methodist Church (Cheyenne, Wyoming)

== See also ==
- The Methodist Church (disambiguation)
- First Methodist Church (disambiguation)
- First United Church (disambiguation)
- United Methodist Church (disambiguation)
- List of Methodist churches
