= Ellie Morrison =

National commissioner of the Boy Scouts of America

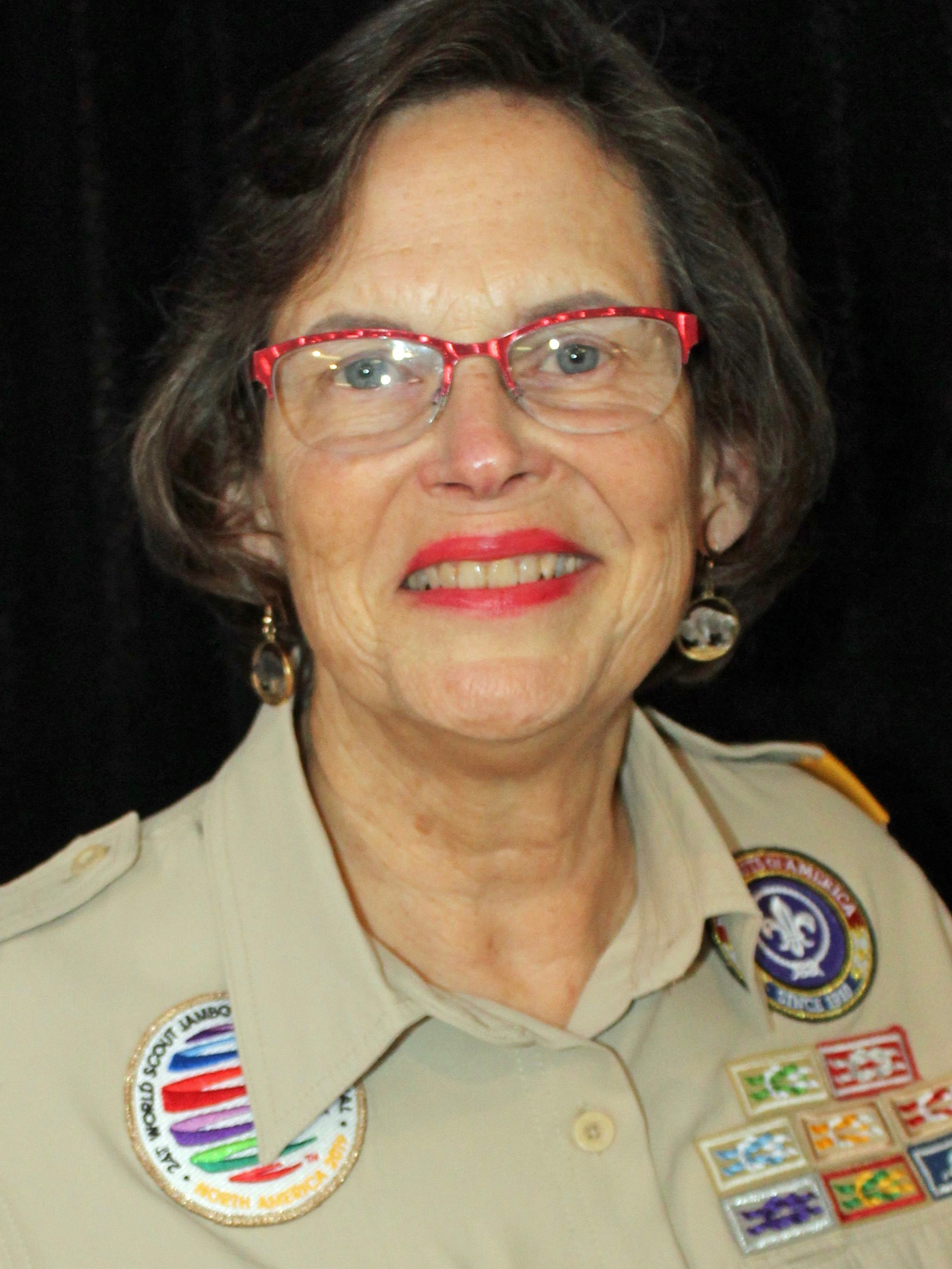
- Ellie Morrison in 2019
- Born: Eleanor Smith; September 5, 1948 (age 77); Waco, Texas, US
- Education: Southern Methodist University, B.A.
- Known for: Scouting
- Spouse: Edwin 'Eddie' Morrison
- Children: two
- Awards: Silver Buffalo

Eleanor Smith Morrison (born September 5, 1948) was elected the 11th National Commissioner of the Boy Scouts of America (BSA) in 2018. She is the first woman to serve in the role since the group was incorporated in 1910. Morrison is a longtime volunteer and philanthropist in her community of Waco, Texas. As National Commissioner, she was one of the top three leaders with the BSA and has been a key advocate for women as Scouts BSA began admitting girls into their program.

== Background ==
Morrison is the daughter of Goodhue Wilson Smith and Ida Lu Smith (née Spurgin). She has three siblings, Goodhue, Hilliard, and Deborah. She graduated from the Southern Methodist University (SMU), where she was a member of the Pi Beta Phi sorority.

After graduating from SMU, Morrison worked as an elementary school teacher. She married noted pathologist Dr. Edwin B. Morrison. and stopped teaching to raise a family. After raising her family, she turned her attention to community and civic organizations. She and her husband have worked together in all of their Scouting careers.

== Civic involvement ==
=== Boy Scouts of America ===
Morrison has worked at all levels of Scouting, first serving as a cub scout leader in her son's pack, and as an assistant scoutmaster in Waco Troop 308.

On the national level, she has chaired the New Unit Task Force, where she helped create the New Member Coordinator position. She also chaired the team that created the Commissioner Award of Excellence for Unit Service, and was a member of the committee that designed the Wood Badge for the 21st Century.

As the BSA's national commissioner, she was also a member of the executive board of its National Council. She continues her work as a local unit commissioner from Troop 308.

=== Other organizations ===
Outside of her work in Scouting, Morrison serves on a number of local boards, including United Way of Waco-McLennan County, Baylor Research, Oakwood Cemetery, and McLennan County Community College Foundation, and the First United Methodist Church in Waco. She works with Food for Families in the Waco area.

== Awards ==
Morrison has been awarded with the Silver Beaver, Silver Antelope, and Silver Buffalo by the Boy Scouts of America. She has also been awarded the National Duty to God recognition.
