= How to =

How to or how-to (among other spellings) may refer to:

- A user guide
- A tutorial
  - Especially, instructional material created for the do it yourself market

== In titles of specific works ==
- How to... (film series), an animated short film series by Walt Disney Productions
- How To (book), a 2019 book by Randall Munroe
- How To with John Wilson, a 2020 HBO comedy-documentary TV series
- How 2, an educational television series
- HOWTO articles, part of the Linux Documentation Project
- HowTo, a satirical wiki project, see: Uncyclopedia § Subprojects
- HowTo.tv, a video website

== See also ==
- wikiHow, an online wiki featuring how-to articles
- HowToBasic, an Australian YouTube comedy channel
- Method (disambiguation)
