= First United Church =

First United Church may refer to:

- First United Church (Ottawa), Ontario, Canada
- First United Church (Swift Current), Saskatchewan, Canada

== See also ==
- First United Methodist Church (disambiguation)
- First United Presbyterian Church (disambiguation)
