= First United Presbyterian Church =

First United Presbyterian Church may refer to:

in the United States

- First United Presbyterian Church (Long Beach, California); see List of City of Long Beach historic landmarks
- First United Presbyterian Church (Loveland, Colorado)
- First United Presbyterian Church (Sterling, Colorado)
- First United Presbyterian Church (Sault Ste. Marie, Michigan)
- First United Presbyterian Church (Auburn, Nebraska)
- First United Presbyterian Church (Madison, Nebraska)
- First United Presbyterian Church (Athens, Tennessee)
