= Knox Presbyterian Church =

Knox Presbyterian Church can refer to:

In Canada:

- Knox Presbyterian Church, (Georgetown)
- Knox Presbyterian Church (Hamilton)
- Knox Presbyterian Church (Oakville)
- Knox Presbyterian Church (Ottawa)
- Knox Presbyterian Church (Swift Current) from 1913 to 1943
- Knox Presbyterian Church (Toronto)
- Knox United Church (Scarborough)

In the United States:

- Knox Presbyterian Church (Harrison Township, Michigan)
- Knox Presbyterian Church, Hyde Park, Cincinnati, Ohio
