= FUMC =

FUMC may refer to:

- First United Methodist Church (disambiguation), various United Methodist congregations
- Foundation University Medical College, a medical school in Pakistan
