= Methodism (disambiguation) =

Methodism is a Protestant Christian movement encompassing numerous denominations.

Methodism or Methodist may also refer to:

- Methodism (philosophy), an approach in philosophy
- Methodic school, an ancient Greek school of medicine, referred to as Methodism
- Methodist Hospital, the name of numerous medical institutions

== See also ==
- Methodology
- Method acting, acting technique where actors draw on real life emotions
- List of Methodist denominations
- List of Methodist churches
- Methodist Church (disambiguation)
- Method (disambiguation)
