= National Register of Historic Places listings in Major County, Oklahoma =

Location of Major County in Oklahoma

This is a detailed table of the National Register of Historic Places listing in Major County, Oklahoma.

This is intended to be a detailed table of the property on the National Register of Historic Places in Major County, Oklahoma, United States. Latitude and longitude coordinates are provided for this property; they may be seen in a map.

There are 3 properties listed on the National Register in the county.

This National Park Service list is complete through NPS recent listings posted March 14, 2025.

== Current listing ==
	Name on the Register	Image	Date listed	Location	City or town	Description
1	Fairview Community Center		December 8, 2015 (#15000873)	206 E. Broadway; 36°16′08″N 98°28′41″W	Fairview	Mis-listed in Oklahoma County.
2	First United Methodist Church		September 3, 2010 (#10000624)	118 N. 7th Ave. 36°16′09″N 98°28′38″W	Fairview	
3	Major County Courthouse		August 23, 1984 (#84003153)	Courthouse Square; 36°16′08″N 98°28′26″W	Fairview	

== See also ==
- List of National Historic Landmarks in Oklahoma
- National Register of Historic Places listings in Oklahoma
