= St. Stephen's Lutheran Church (South Carolina) =

Lutheran church in South Carolina

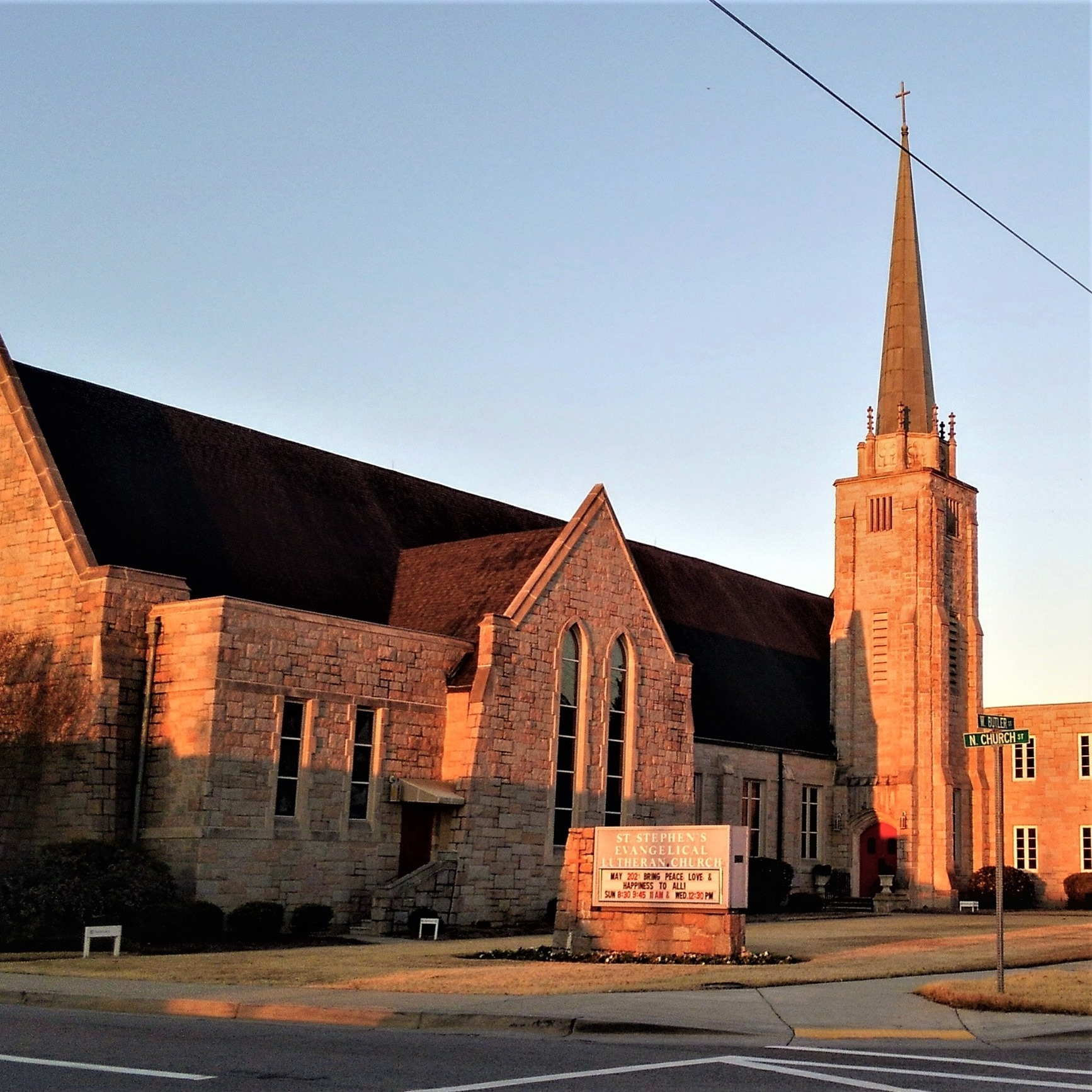
- Image of St. Stephen's Lutheran Church
- Location: 119 N Church St, Lexington, SC 29072
- Country: United States
- Denomination: Evangelical Lutheran Church in America
- Website: https://www.sslc.org

History
- Founded: 1830

Clergy
- Pastor: Ralph Hill

St. Stephen's Evangelical Lutheran Church (SSLC) is a historic Lutheran Church at 119 N Church Street in Lexington, South Carolina. The Church is affiliated with the ELCA as a member of the South Carolina Synod. The church holds worship on Sundays at 8:30 AM and 11 AM as well as on Wednesdays at Noon and livestreams each of these services on the church's YouTube Channel. Current pastors are Jason Antley and Ralph Hill. As of the SC Synod's 2020 annual report, St. Stephen's has 1,716 baptized members and 1,100 active participants, which is the most of any ELCA Congregation in South Carolina. The same report also lists the church as having the third highest average online attendance (600) and the fifth highest average in person attendance (209) of churches within the synod, making it one of the largest Lutheran Churches in the state.

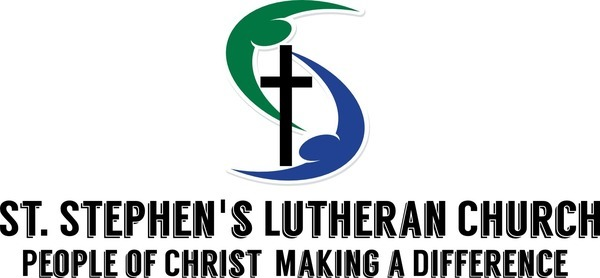
Logo of St. Stephen's Lutheran Church

== Church History ==
St. Stephen's is the oldest church community within the town of Lexington having been founded there in 1830. The congregation's current place of worship is the fourth incarnation of the church, having been reconstructed 3 times throughout the church's history. The church has historical ties to the Lutheran Theological Southern Seminary which from 1834 to 1856 was located in Lexington. It is likely that these students attended St. Stephen's during their time of study.

=== Building History ===
St. Stephen's Lutheran Church was originally built in 1831 as the first church in the Lexington community. This church was also the first in this community to have a balcony. In 1865, the building was one of many in the state to be burned down by Sherman's Union forces during The Carolinas Campaign of the United States Civil War.

John C. Hope was the first minister.

The church was reconstructed 5 years later, having been completed in 1870 with a narthex, belfry, and spire, on the same grounds as the original church. In 1897, this second building too was destroyed by fire along with other surrounding buildings, though the circumstances of the building's destruction are largely unknown.

Construction for the third building begun in 1896, before the second building was burned down, though it wouldn't be completed until 1900. This building was constructed across the street from the original grounds and served the congregation until 1957, when it was demolished to make way for the church's current building to be built on the same grounds.

Construction for the church's current building would begin in 1957 starting with the new Sanctuary and Educational hall, which were both completed the following year in 1958. Since then, an additional wing of the church was built which includes more classrooms, office space, and a multipurpose gymnasium with a stage. A historical marker for St. Stephen's Lutheran Church was erected by the congregation in 1994.

=== Pipe Organ History ===
The first pipe organ of St. Stephen's was installed in 1922 having been built by the M.P. Möller Organ Company. It consisted of 11 stops, 7 ranks, 6 pistons, and 8 couplers which controlled 398 pipes in total. After construction was completed, there was a dedication concert performed by organist Mrs. E.B. Roof and a collaboration of local musicians.

When the current sanctuary was rebuilt, a new pipe organ was built for the sanctuary by the PELS Organ Company of The Netherlands. This organ had 2 manuals and a 32 note pedalboard and originally had 15 stops, 17 ranks, and 9 couplers which having a total number of 1,116 pipes.

In 1977, a decision was made to purchase another organ by the M.P Möller Company citing issues of performance with the PELS Organ. The church's current organ, M.P Möller Opus #11336 was completed the following year in 1978. This organ was built with 3 Manuals, 4 ranks, 4 divisions, 25 stops, and 22 registers controlling a grand total of 1,348 pipes. New features and reworks of the organ's digital controls were added to the organ in 2005 and 2011.
