= The Method =

The Method may refer to:

== Science ==
- The Method of Mechanical Theorems, a work of Archimedes
- Discourse on the Method, a work of Descartes

== Arts and entertainment ==
- The Method (TV series), a 2015 Russian television drama series
- The Method (album), a 1997 album by Killing Time
- The Method (2005 film), a film by Marcelo Piñeyro
- The Method (2023 film), a Dominican comedy-drama thriller film
- The Method (novel), a 2009 novel by Juli Zeh
- Andwella or The Method, a band of UK/Irish origin
- "The Method", a song by We Are Scientists from Safety, Fun, and Learning (In That Order)
- Method acting
  - Stanislavski's system

== See also ==
- Method (disambiguation)
