= Method =

Method (Ancient Greek: μέθοδος, methodos, from μετά/meta "in pursuit or quest of" + ὁδός/hodos "a method, system; a way or manner" of doing, saying, etc.), literally means a pursuit of knowledge, investigation, mode of prosecuting such inquiry, or system. In recent centuries it more often means a prescribed process for completing a task.

It may refer to:

- Scientific method, a series of steps, or collection of methods, taken to acquire knowledge
- Method (computer programming), a piece of code associated with a class or object to perform a task
- Method (patent), under patent law, a protected series of steps or acts
- Methodism, a Christian religious movement
- Methodology, comparison or study and critique of individual methods that are used in a given discipline or field of inquiry
- Discourse on the Method, a philosophical and mathematical treatise by René Descartes
- Methods (journal), a scientific journal covering research on techniques in the experimental biological and medical sciences

== Arts ==
- Method (music), a kind of textbook to help students learning to play a musical instrument
- Method (2004 film), a 2004 film directed by Duncan Roy
- Method (2017 film), a South Korean film
- Method (Godhead), the bassist and programmer for the industrial band Godhead
- Method acting, a style of acting in which the actor attempts to replicate the conditions under which the character operates
- "Method Acting" (song), by the group Bright Eyes on their album Lifted or The Story Is in the Soil, Keep Your Ear to the Ground
- Method ringing, a British style of ringing church bells according to a series of mathematical algorithms
- Method Man, an American rapper
- "Method", a song by Living Colour from the album The Chair in the Doorway
- "A Method", a song by TV on the Radio from the album Return to Cookie Mountain

== Business ==
- Method Incorporated, an international brand experience agency
- Method Products (branded as "method"), a San Francisco–based corporation that manufactures household products
- Method Studios, a Los Angeles–based visual effects company

== See also ==
- Methodology
- The Method (disambiguation)
- Methodism (disambiguation)
