= United Methodist Church (disambiguation) =

United Methodist Church may refer to:

== Denominations ==
- United Methodist Church in the United States, Africa, The Philippines, and Europe
- United Methodist Church (Great Britain), which merged with other British Methodist denominations in 1932

== Individual churches ==
- First United Methodist Church (Jasper, Florida), listed on the National Register of Historic Places (NRHP)
- United Methodist Church of Batavia, Batavia, Illinois, NRHP-listed
- United Methodist Church (Washington, New Jersey), NRHP-listed, also known as First Methodist Episcopal Church
- United Methodist Church (Chaumont, New York), NRHP-listed
- United Methodist Church of the Highlands, Highland Falls, New York; formerly First Presbyterian Church of Highland Falls
- United Methodist Church (Morristown, New York), NRHP-listed
- United Methodist Church and Parsonage (Mount Kisco, New York), NRHP-listed
- United Methodist Church (Patchogue, New York), NRHP-listed
- Walden United Methodist Church, Walden, New York, NRHP-listed
- United Methodist Church (Waterloo, New York), NRHP-listed
- Armstrong Chapel United Methodist Church, Indian Hill, Ohio; also known as United Methodist Church
- United Methodist Church (Mechanicsburg, Ohio), NRHP-listed
- United Methodist Church (Millersburg, Ohio), NRHP-listed

== See also ==
- List of Methodist churches
- First United Methodist Church (disambiguation)
- The Methodist Church (disambiguation)
