= Fairview Community Center =

- U.S. National Register of Historic Places
- Location within Oklahoma
- Location: 206 E. Broadway, Fairview, Oklahoma
- Coordinates: 36°16′08″N 98°28′41″W
- Built: 1939
- Architect: John C. Hope
- NRHP reference No.: 15000873
- Added to NRHP: December 8, 2015

The Fairview Community Center is located at 206 E. Broadway in Fairview, Oklahoma in Major County, Oklahoma. It was built in 1939 and was listed on the National Register of Historic Places in 2015.

It was deemed significant for its association with the Public Works Administration. It was designed by John C. Hope, an Oklahoma City architect.

The only other two buildings in Fairview built by a New Deal era program are:

- WPA-built fire station, since demolished
- the Major County Exhibit/Livestock Building, also WPA-built, which has been modified by a standing seam roofing system addition.

Note: This is misidentified by the National Register as being in Oklahoma County.
