= First United Presbyterian Church (Sterling, Colorado) =

Historic church in Colorado, United States

- U.S. National Register of Historic Places
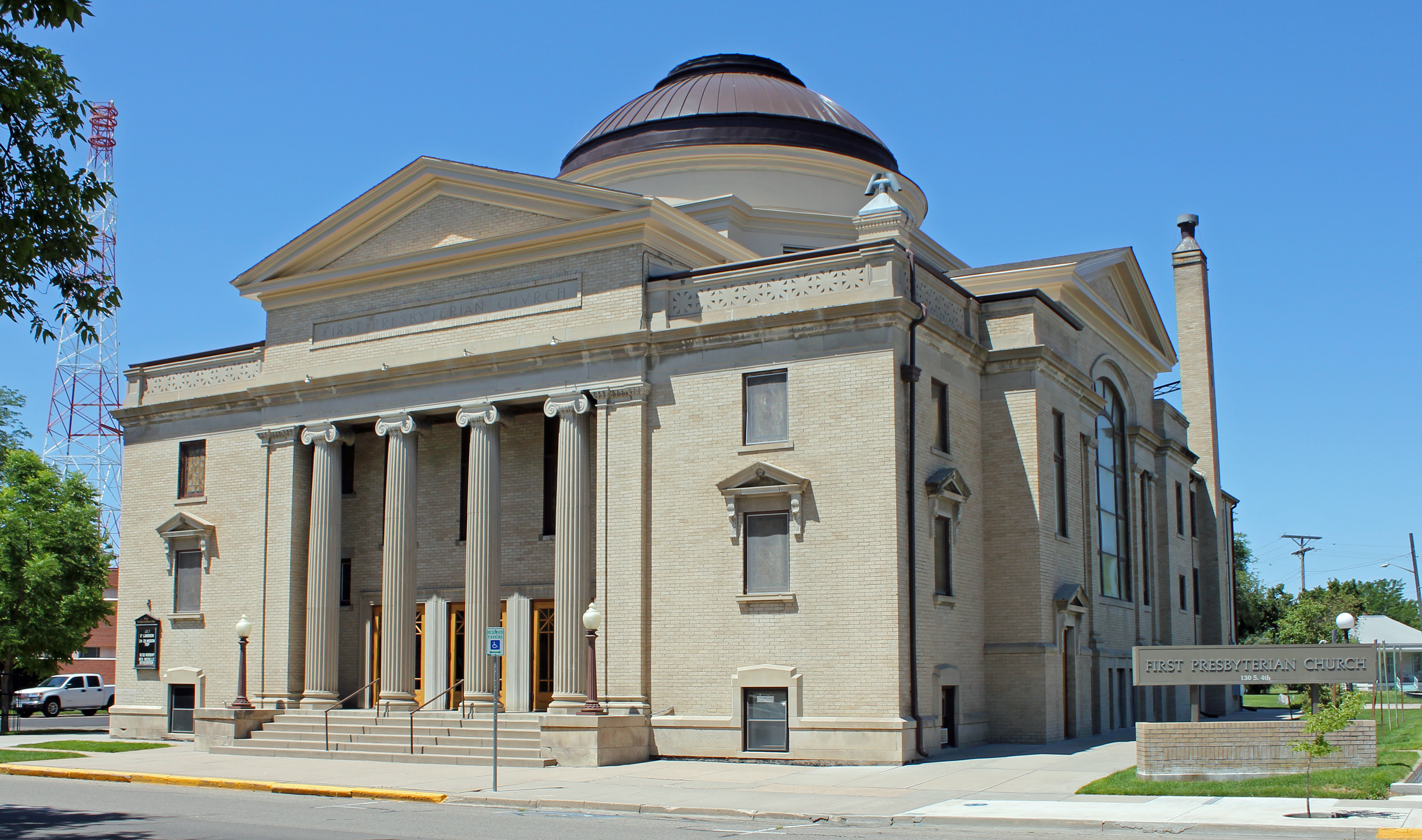

- Location within Colorado Location within the United States
- Location: 130 S. 4th St., Sterling, Colorado
- Coordinates: 40°37′25″N 103°12′37″W
- Area: less than one acre
- Built: 1919
- Architect: J.C. Fulton
- Architectural style: Classical Revival
- NRHP reference No.: 82002304
- Added to NRHP: June 3, 1982

The First United Presbyterian Church in Sterling, Colorado is a historic church at 130 S. 4th Street. Its present building was built in 1919 and was added to the National Register in 1982.

It has a monumental two-story portico with four fluted, Ionic columns. The portico is flanked by engaged brick pilasters and is topped by a cornice-boxed pediment.

The church was first organized in 1878, in a sod schoolhouse in a homestead colony about 3.5 miles (5.6 km) northeast of Sterling.
