= First United Methodist Church (Buffalo, Wyoming) =

Church in the U.S. state of Wyoming

- Methodist Episcopal Church
- U.S. National Register of Historic Places
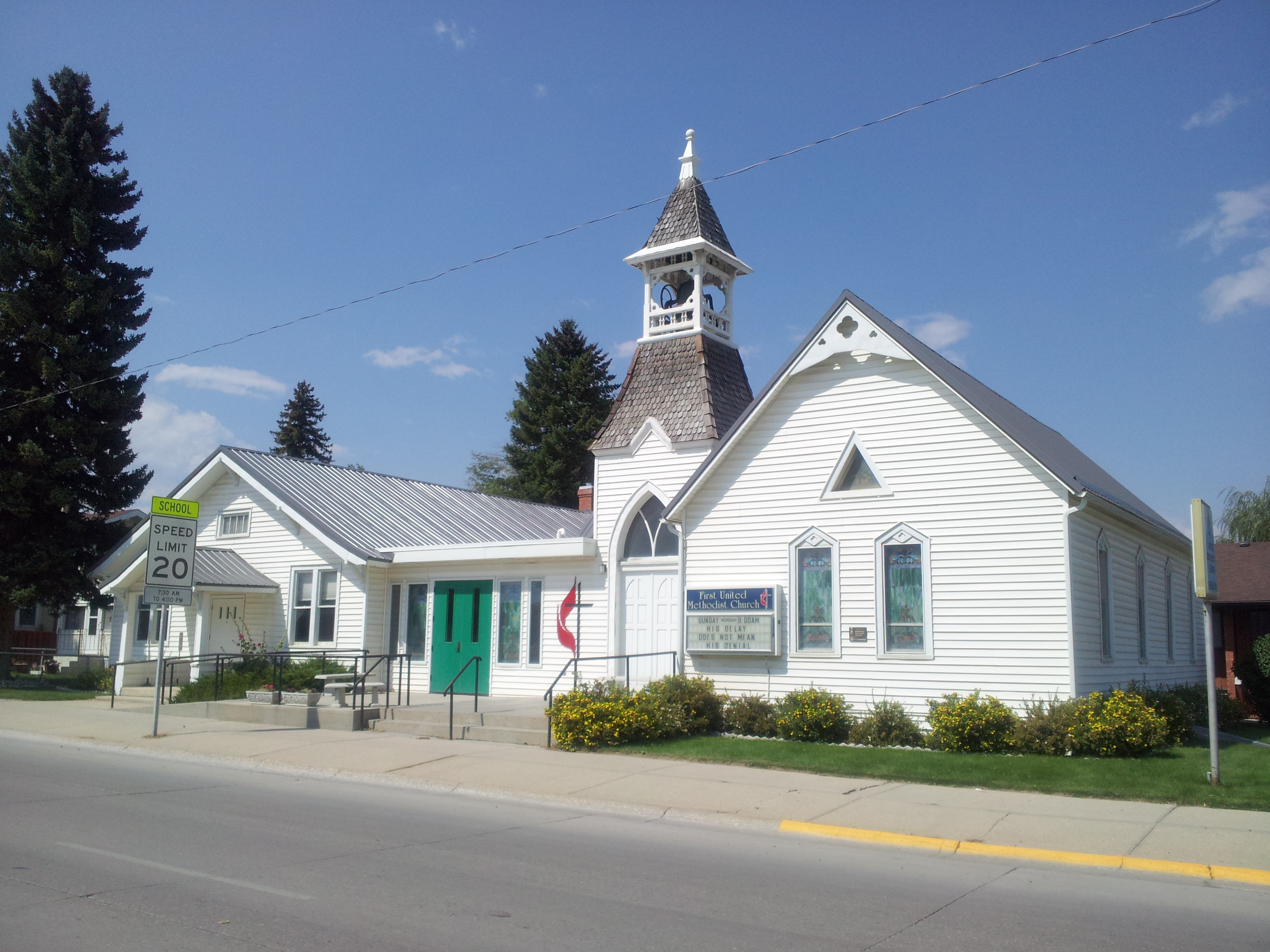

- Location within Wyoming Location within the United States
- Location: 132 N. Adams St., Buffalo, Wyoming
- Coordinates: 44°20′55″N 106°42′1″W
- Area: 0.3 acres (0.12 ha)
- Built: 1899
- Architect: E.J. Robinson
- Architectural style: Akron plan
- NRHP reference No.: 76001952
- Added to NRHP: September 13, 1976

First United Methodist Church is a historic Methodist church at Fort and N. Adams Streets in Buffalo, Wyoming, United States. The church was built in 1899, and was added to the National Register of Historic Places in 1976 as the Methodist Episcopal Church. It is located at the corner of Adams Avenue and Fort Street in Buffalo, Wyoming.

== Construction ==
The Methodist Episcopal Church in Buffalo was organized on October 7, 1892, with the appointment of the first minister, Reverend H.A. Toland. Reverend E.J. Robinson was appointed as minister in 1895, and he supervised the construction of the church building. The building was built by members of the congregation, and the total cost was $2075.00.

The design of the church probably came from an architectural pattern book. The cornerstone was laid on August 17, 1898, and laid within the stone were a Bible, a hymnal, a copy of the Church Discipline, several church papers, and some coins. The stone was made and presented by Z.T. Stocks, a stonemason. The interior of the church building follows the Akron Plan, which typifies many Methodist churches in the American West. The plan, which originated in Akron, Ohio, emphasizes good acoustics, good sight lines, and flexibility, with a focus on the pulpit and communion table. The elevated platform for preaching is placed in the corner of the audience room, with the seating in a circular pattern. The main room of the church measures 22' by 36', the lecture room measures 14' by 12', and the bell tower is 40' tall.

The pews were obtained from the Methodist Church in Sheridan, Wyoming. The pulpit was donated by Dave Muir and the "Scotch Boys." A basement was built in 1906 so that a hearing plant could be added. The stained glass windows were donated in 1916. An electric organ was donated by members of the church in memory of relatives. On December 19, 1923, a fire damaged the rear part of the building. When the basement the church was restored after the fire, the building was lengthened by addition 16 feet to the north. A small choir room was also added.

== Church History ==
A Social Center was added in 1917, and that was connected to the main building in 1993. In 1939, the church's name was changed to the First United Methodist Church. A Sunday school building was added in 1959. The church is the current home of a congregation now known as the First United Methodist Church of Buffalo Wyoming.
