= First United Presbyterian Church (Sault Ste. Marie, Michigan) =

Historic church in Michigan, United States

- U.S. National Register of Historic Places
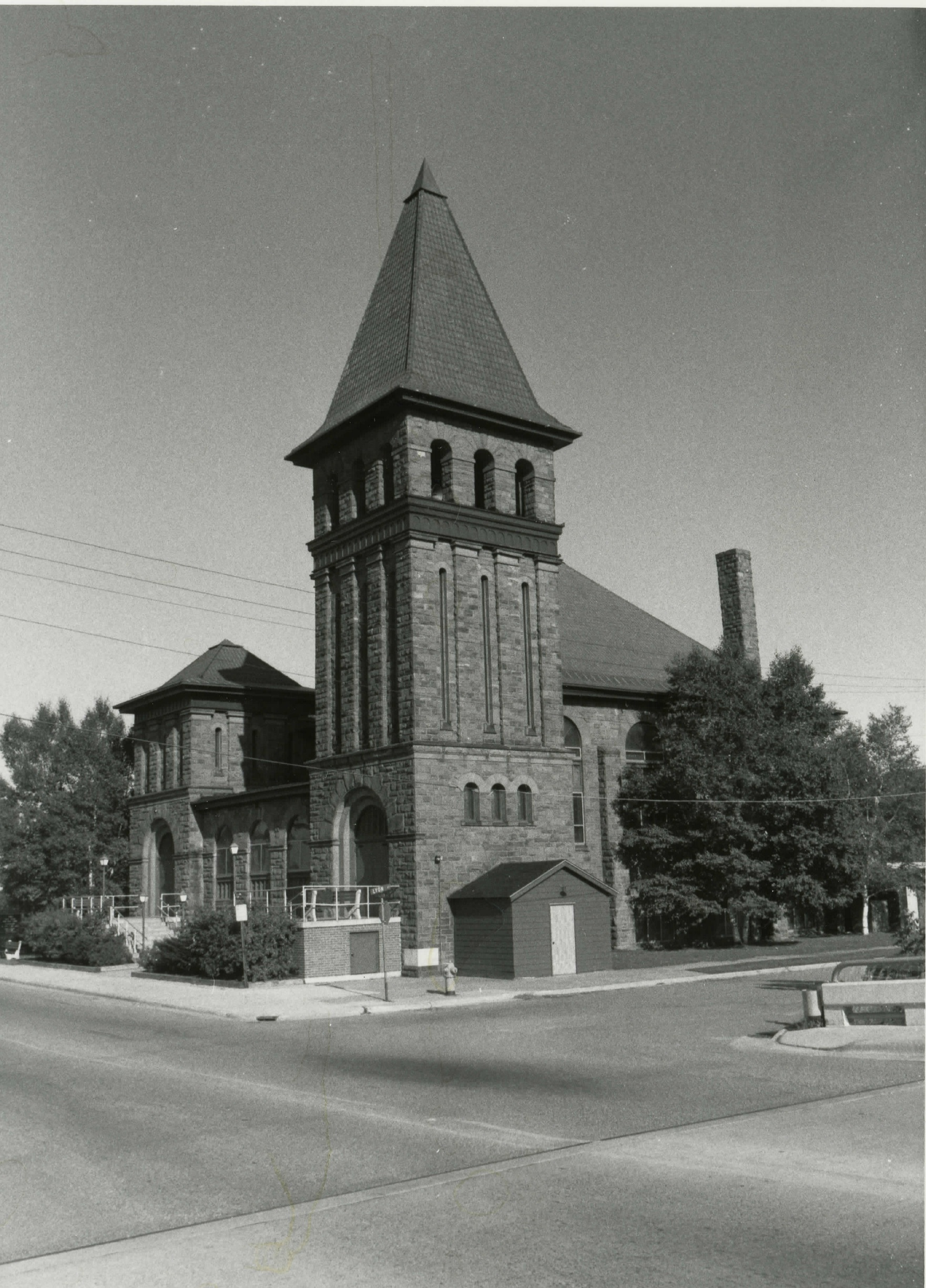
- First United Presbyterian Church, 1983

- Location within Michigan Location within the United States
- Interactive map
- Location: 309 Lyon St., Sault Ste. Marie, Michigan
- Coordinates: 46°29′41″N 84°20′47″W
- Built: 1903
- Architect: Edward Demar
- Architectural style: Romanesque Revival
- Demolished: 2000
- NRHP reference No.: 84000538
- Added to NRHP: December 27, 1984

First United Presbyterian Church is a historic church at 309 Lyon Street in Sault Ste. Marie, Michigan.

The original church building was constructed in 1902 and was added to the National Register of Historic Places in 1984. That building was destroyed by fire in 2000 and rebuilt 2002. As of 2012, the congregation is affiliated with the Presbyterian Church (U.S.A.).

== Early history ==
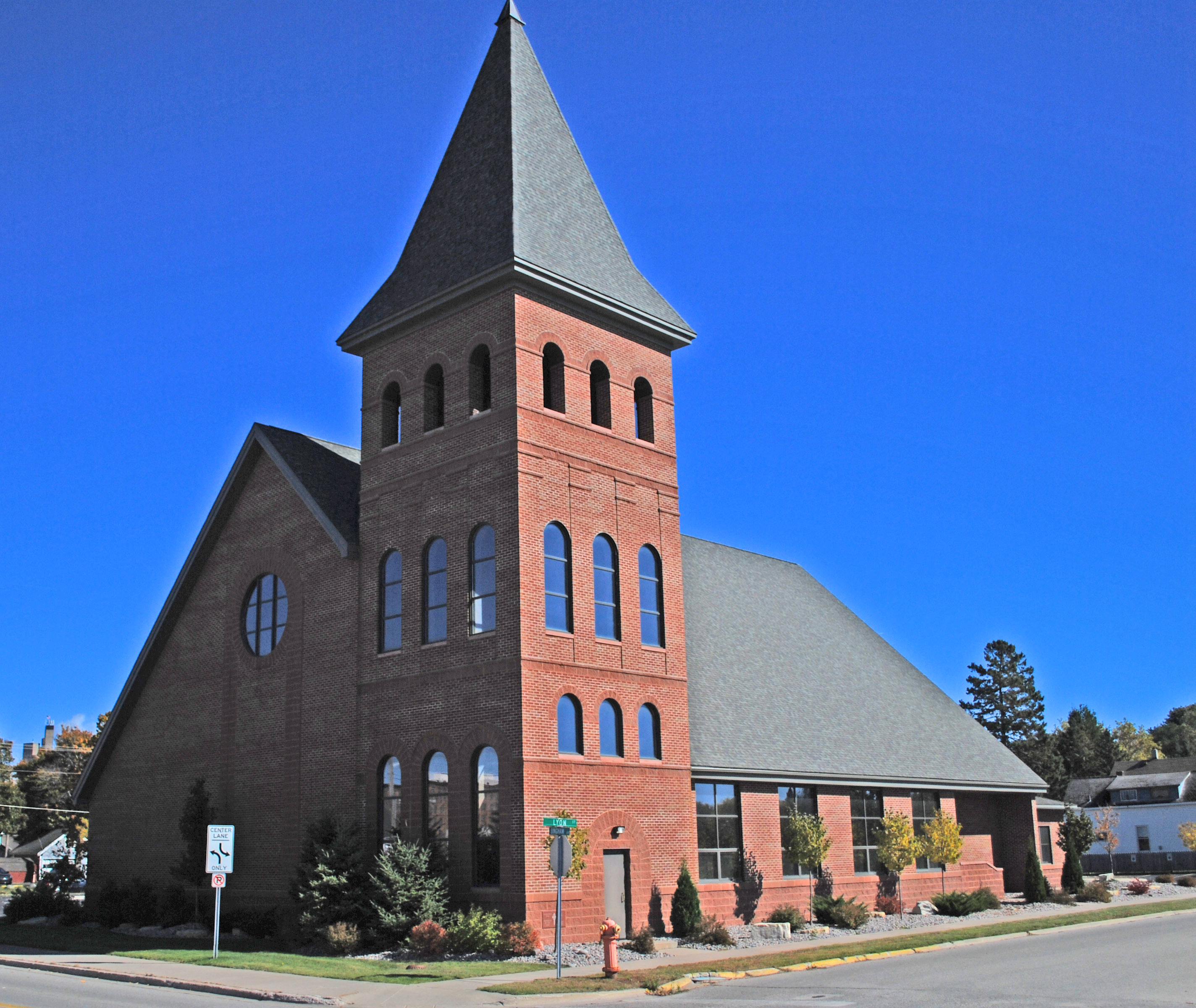
2003 church, built after 1903 church was destroyed by fire

The first Presbyterian presence in Sault Ste. Marie came in 1823, when divinity student Robert McMurtrie Laird was assigned to minister to the troops stationed at Fort Brady. Laird, however, was unhappy with the area and ill-suited for his responsibilities, and left in early 1824. A second try came in 1831, when Reverend Jeremiah Porter arrived in the area, also ministering to the troops stationed at Fort Brady. The First Presbyterian Church of Sault Ste. Marie was founded the following year, when a small church was constructed by Mrs. John Johnson. However, in 1833, Porter left, along with a contingent of troops, to move to Fort Dearborn in Chicago. There Porter founded the First Presbyterian Church of Chicago, and ministered to that congregation for he rest of his life. However, when Porter left Sault Ste. Marie, the congregation there withered.

Finally, in 1853, Charles T. Harvey of the St. Mary's Fall Ship Canal Company revived the church and requested a new pastor. Rev. William McCullough was assigned to minister to the Sault, and in 1854 a new church was constructed and the congregation was formally organized, making it the first such church in the Upper Peninsula. However, McCullough soon contacted pneumonia and died, leaving the congregation once more without a pastor. The congregation dwindled yet again, until in 1860 there were only six members.

In 1864, however, the congregation hired Rev. Thomas R. Easterday. Easterday was considered quite liberal, and the church grew quickly under his leadership, growing to around 200 people. In about 1872, the congregation rebuilt the church. However, in 1882, Easterday suffered a stroke and retired from active ministry, although he lived and participated in the community until his death in 1927.

The church went through a series of pastors over the next few years, with Alexander P. Danskin serving from 1882 to 1886, Rev. Harlan Page Corey serving from 1886 to 1890, Rev. George W. Luther serving from 1890 to 1894, and C.P. Bates serving from 1894 to 1901. During the early 1890s, the congregation bought a parcel of land, where the present church now stands, with the intention of erecting a new building in which to worship, the fourth such for the congregation.

Rev. James A. Kennedy served the church from 1902 to 1912. Preliminary work on the church building, including obtaining a design from architect Edward Demar, had already been completed. In August 1902, only four months after his arrival, Kennedy laid the cornerstone of the church. Construction was completed, and the building dedicated, on Easter Sunday 1903.

== 1903 building description ==
The First Presbyterian Church was a Romanesque Revival structure built of Jacobsville Sandstone. The main structure had a hip roof with two square towers with pyramid roofs, each containing entrances on their bases. A metal cornice topped each tower. The structure had a metal roof painted green to mimic tile. A wooden belt course ran across the front facade, and modern brick stairs approached the entryways. Inside the church, the gallery was shaped like a horseshoe, and the auditorium had a central pulpit with a choir area and organ behind. A 1957-58 educational wing was attached to the rear of the building.

== Later history ==
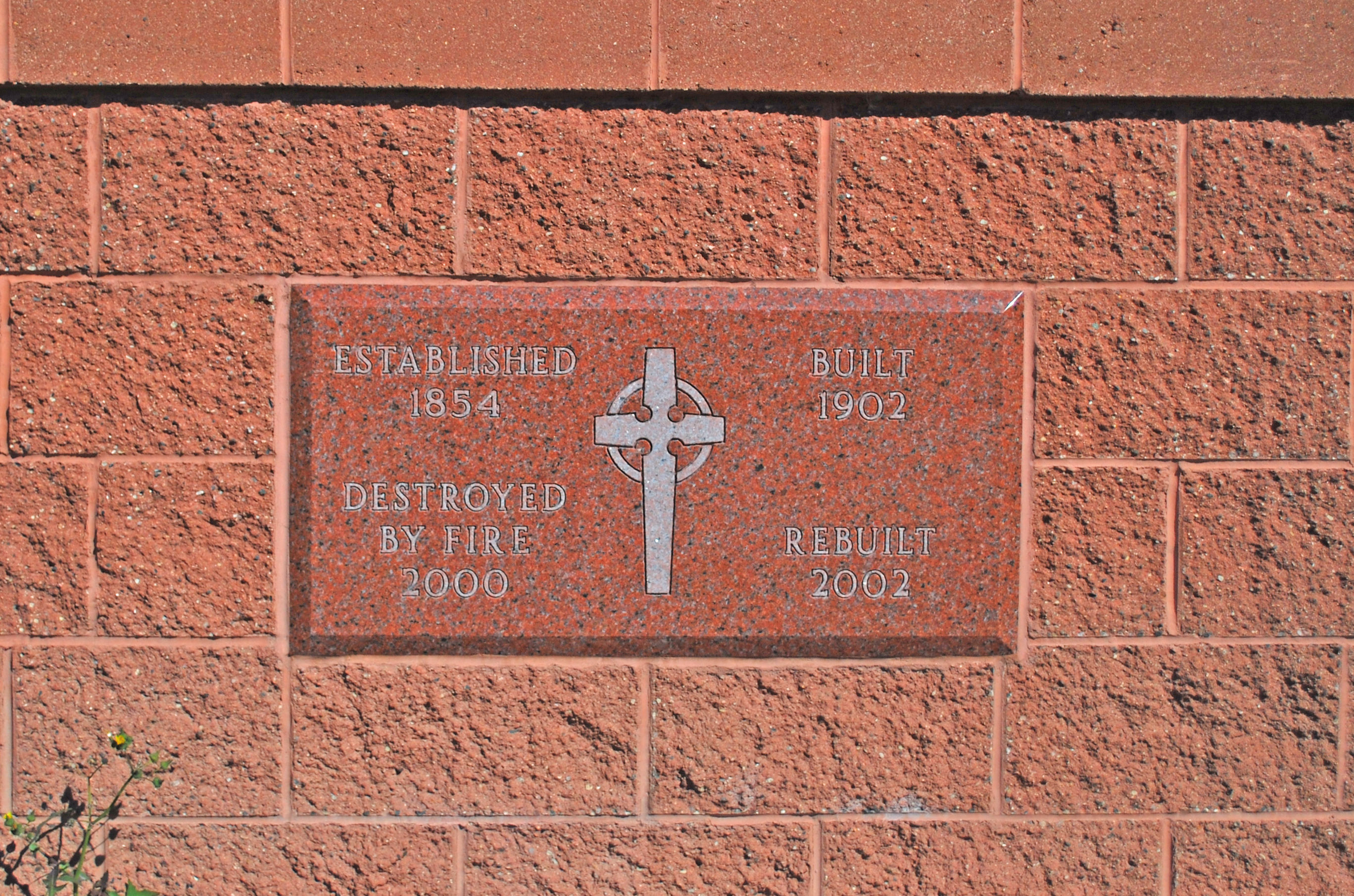
Cornerstone of new church

Rev. Robert A. Bartlett took over from Kennedy, and served the congregation from 1912 to 1919. Rev. R. Stanley Brown served from 1919 to 1925, Dr. John VerStraate served from 1925 to 1949, and Rev. David McClean served from 1949 to 1959. During his tenure an educational wing was constructed and new steps added to the church. Dr. Joseph Blackburn served from 1960 to 1971, Dr. James D. Lyman served from 1972 to 1981, Rev. John Kipp served from 1981 to 1987, and Rev. David Henderson served from 1988 to 2008.

However, on Sunday, May 7, 2000, the church building caught fire and burned to the ground. The fire likely originated from faulty electrical wire. Only a few items from the 1903 church were salvageable, including official church records, some of the dishes and silver, some of the stained glass windows, and some furniture, including a pew originally installed in the 1854 church.

Although insurenace did not cover the cost of a new building, a decision was made to rebuild. A new church was constructed to replace the 1903 structure, located on the same site. Ground was broken on July 22, 2001; the cornerstone was laid September 30, 2002, and the first service was held in the structure August 10, 2003.

After Rev. David Henderson retired in 2008, Dr. Richard Bates became the interim pastor, and in 2010 Rev. Mark Gabbard was installed as a permanent pastor. The church continues to serve Sault Ste. Marie.
