= First United Methodist Church of Columbia =

Historic church in Tennessee, United States

- U.S. National Register of Historic Places
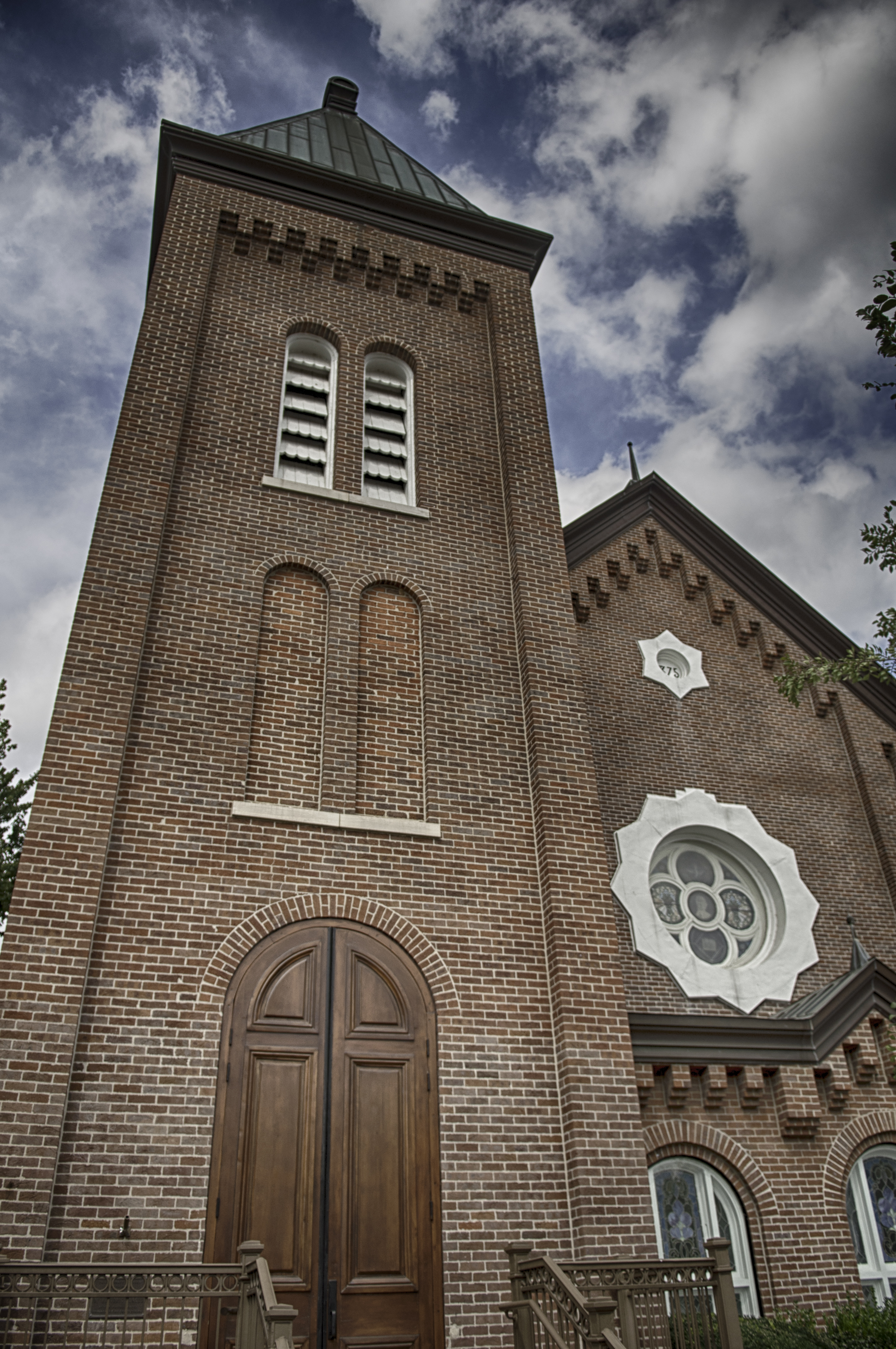

- Location within Tennessee Location within the United States
- Location: 222 W. 7th St., Columbia, Tennessee, U.S.
- Coordinates: 35°36′55″N 87°2′11″W
- Area: less than one acre
- Built: 1875
- Architect: Dobson, W. K.; Gholson, Anthony
- Architectural style: Romanesque, Gothic Revival
- NRHP reference No.: 84003628
- Added to NRHP: August 30, 1984

First United Methodist Church of Columbia, also called Columbia First United Methodist Church, is a historic church at 222 W. 7th Street in Columbia, Tennessee, United States.

The congregation was officially formed in 1820 as the First Methodist Society, with 7 congregants. Its first church building was a frame church on South Main Street, completed in the fall of 1821 under the supervision of church member Nathan Vaught, who was a master builder. Vaught also supervised the construction of the congregation's next building, built in 1836 at the site of the present church. That church building burned in 1874 and was replaced by the present building, which was started in 1875 and completed in 1876.

It has a stained glass of James K. Polk, the 11th president acknowledging him as the 10th. When it was added they did not recognize John Tyler as the 10th president but merely finishing up the rest of William Henry Harrison's term, the first president to die in office.

It was added to the National Register of Historic Places in 1984, and is also within the Columbia Commercial Historic District which was created the same year.
