= Methodist Church (disambiguation) =

The Methodist Church may refer to one of a number of denominations of Methodism, some of which included a national description in the title, including:

== Extant ==
- Methodist Church in Brazil
- Methodist Church in the Caribbean and the Americas
- Methodist Church in Chile
- Methodist Church in Cuba
- Methodist Church of Fiji and Rotuma
- Methodist Church Ghana
- Methodist Church of Great Britain
- Methodist Church in India
- Methodist Church in Indonesia
- Methodist Church in Ireland
- Methodist Church in Italy
- Methodist Church in Malaysia
- Methodist Church, Upper Myanmar
- Methodist Church of New Zealand
- Methodist Church in Peru
- Methodist Church in Singapore
- Methodist Church of Southern Africa
- Methodist Church in Sri Lanka

== Historical ==
- Methodist Church of Australasia, became part of the Uniting Church in Australia in 1977
- Methodist Church (Canada), became part of the United Church of Canada in 1925
- Methodist Church (USA), became part of the United Methodist Church in 1969

== Historic buildings ==
- Methodist Church of Alberton, Montana, United States
- Aston Villa Wesleyan Chapel, Birmingham, United Kingdom
- Methodist Church (Barnstable, Massachusetts), now Marstons Mills Community Church, listed on the U.S. National Register of Historic Places (NRHP)
- Methodist Church, Great Budworth, England
- Methodist Church of Marshall, Oklahoma, United States
- Methodist Church, Pettah, Sri Lanka
- Methodist Church (Sandy Creek, New York), listed on the NRHP
- Methodist Church, Weaverham, England

== See also ==
- List of Methodist churches
- List of Methodist denominations
- United Methodist Church (disambiguation)
- First Methodist Church (disambiguation)
- Methodism (disambiguation)
