= First Methodist Church (Midland, Texas) =

- First Methodist Church
- 32.0003°N 102.0743°W
- Country: United States
- Denomination: Methodist
- Website: firstmethodistmidland.com

History
- Status: Church
- Founded: August 23, 1885

Architecture
- Functional status: Active

First Methodist Church is a Methodist church in Midland, Texas. It is known as the church at which Laura Welch married future president George W. Bush in 1977.

== History ==
Founded in 1885, the church was the first congregation organized in Midland. The church completed its first building at 100 N. Main in 1889 and moved to its current site at 300 N. Main in 1907. The current sanctuary was dedicated in 1968, and the Glass Memorial Chapel—the location of the Bush-Welch wedding—was completed in 1976.

In 2022, the church voted to disaffiliate from the United Methodist Church.
