= Scouting for Food =

- Founded: 1985

Scouting for Food is an ongoing annual program of Scouting America. It began in 1981 as an Eagle Project by Christopher DuBois of Troop 643, St. Ann, MO. Then in 1985 the Greater Saint Louis Area Council implemented it as a council wide project. The program was adopted nationally by the Boy Scouts of America (BSA) in 1988, becoming America's largest one-day food drive to help the hungry. The program involves collecting for local food banks. It is organized at the local level throughout the country.

Scouting for Food is a project rooted in the foundation of the Scouting movement, designed to implement the Scout Slogan and do a good turn daily.

In some areas, the drive is called "Food for Families," or "Canning Hunger."

== Background ==
Each year, local Cub Scouts and Scouts leave plastic bags for their neighbors soliciting canned food items. One week later, the Scouts return to pick up and deliver the bags of food to a local food bank. The donations will usually be delivered directly to the local food bank that day. The annual collection is usually done during the month of November.
