= First United Methodist Church (Aberdeen, South Dakota) =

Historic church in South Dakota, United States

- Aberdeen First United Methodist Church
- U.S. National Register of Historic Places
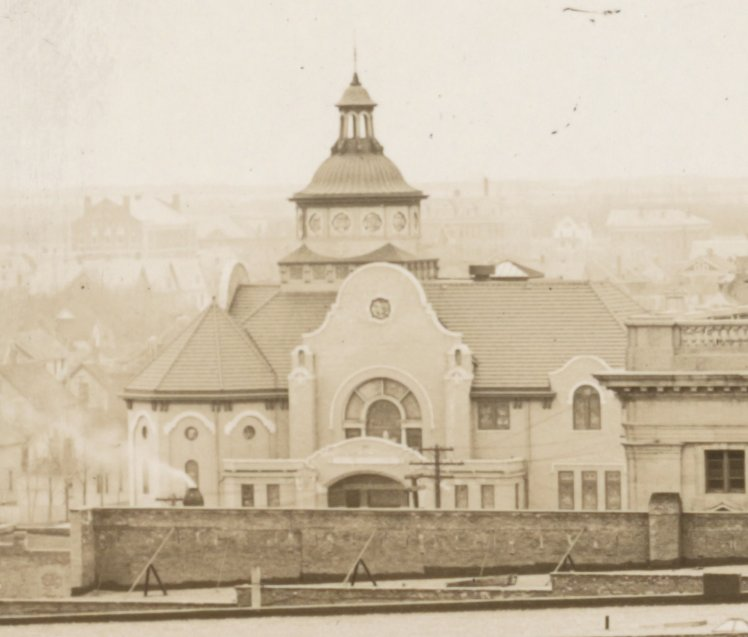
- Church circa 1912

- Location within South Dakota Location within the United States
- Location: S. Lincoln St. and SE 5th Ave., Aberdeen, South Dakota
- Coordinates: 45°27′36″N 98°29′12″W
- Area: 1 acre (0.40 ha)
- Built: 1904-05
- Architectural style: Eclectic Revival, Byzantine
- NRHP reference No.: 76001719
- Added to NRHP: May 28, 1976

Aberdeen First United Methodist Church is a historic church at S. Lincoln Street and SE 5th Avenue in Aberdeen, South Dakota. The church was built during 1904-05 and dedicated November 7, 1909. It was added to the National Register in 1976.

The building features a "dome on pendentives" with "an open lantern atop the Terneplate-covered roof."
