= First United Methodist Church (Louisa, Kentucky) =

Historic church in Kentucky, United States

- U.S. National Register of Historic Places
- Location within Kentucky Location within the United States
- Location: 204 W. Main St., Louisa, Kentucky
- Coordinates: 38°6′52″N 82°36′21″W
- Area: less than one acre
- Built: c.1850
- Architectural style: Gothic Revival
- NRHP reference No.: 84000391
- Added to NRHP: November 15, 1984

The First United Methodist Church of Louisa, Kentucky is a historic church built in c.1850. It is located at 204 W. Main Street in Louisa. It was added to the National Register of Historic Places in 1984.

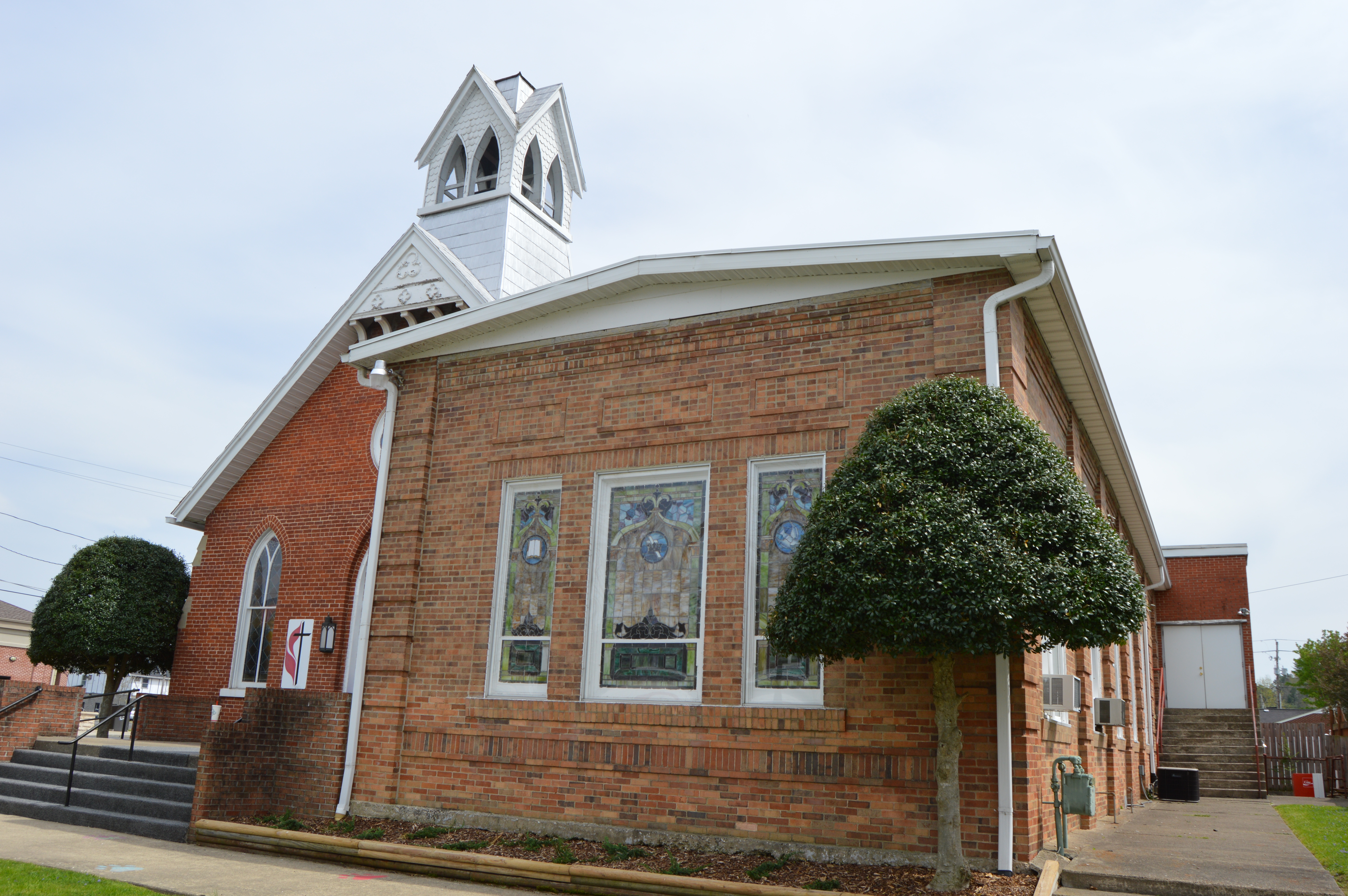
View of historic church is mostly blocked by a modern addition in this 2014 photo

It was deemed notable as "one of the best examples of Gothic Revival church architecture in the Big Sandy Valley of Eastern Kentucky. Built around 1850, it is today one of the oldest existing buildings in the town and one of the oldest, if not the oldest, Methodist Church in the Big Sandy Valley Area."
