= Franklin First United Methodist Church =

Historic church in Ohio

Coordinates: 39°33′39″N 84°18′13″W

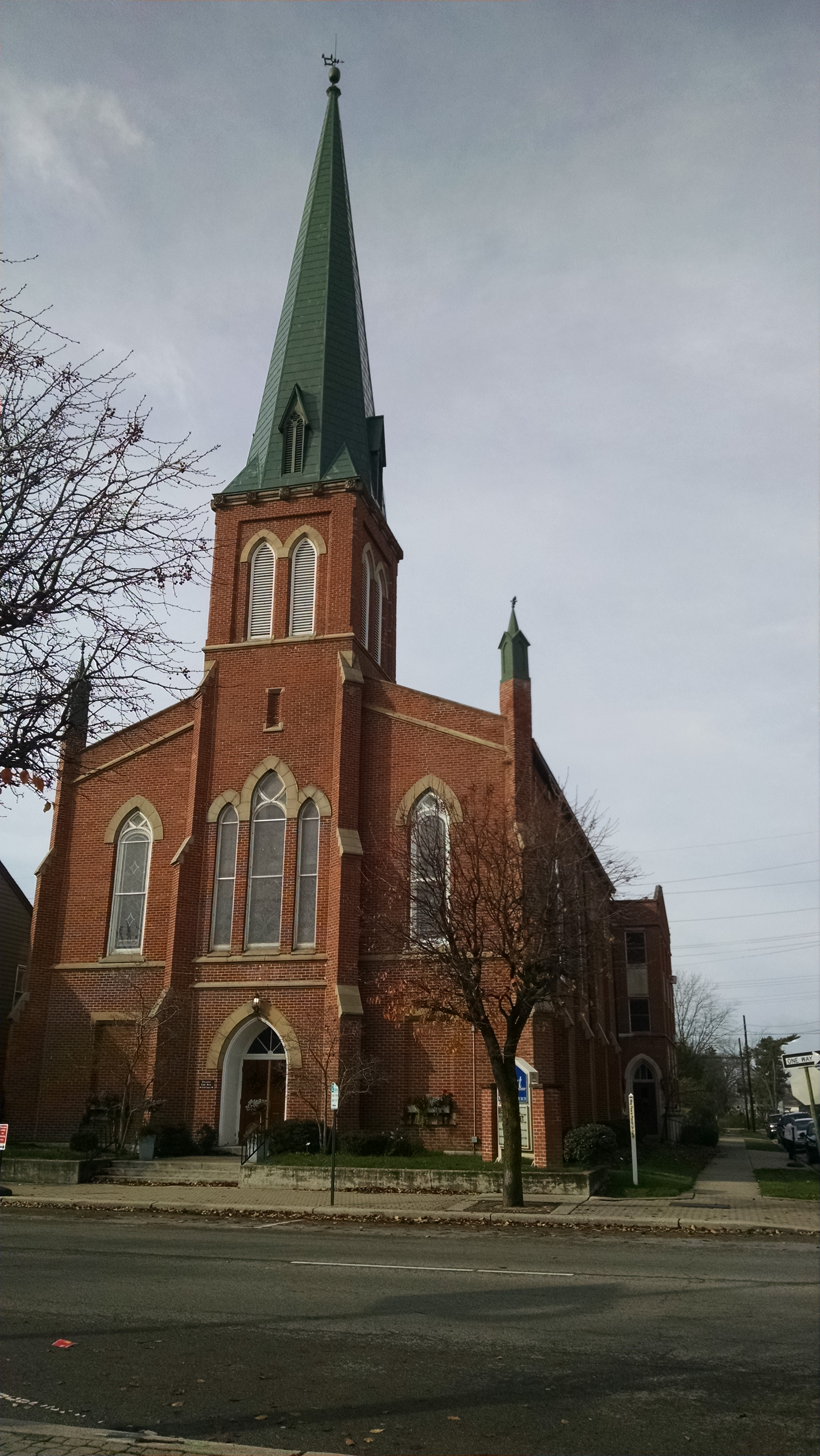
The Franklin First United Methodist Church as seen facing westward from Main Street.

The Franklin First United Methodist Church is a historic church in downtown Franklin, Ohio, USA. A Methodist affiliated church since its founding, it is the oldest church in the city and one of the oldest churches in Warren County. The church is a member congregation of the United Methodist Church.

== Early history ==
In 1798, the Methodist Episcopal bishop Francis Asbury sent John Kobler across the Ohio River and into the Northwest Territory "to form a new circuit and to plant the first principles of the Gospel" in the frontier region of the Great Miami River. He as well as other circuit riders made frequent stops in Franklin and the town became a regular stop for itinerant ministers until 1853, when a permanent pastor was assigned to the town.

In 1825, a permanent Methodist Episcopal Society was formed in the town, with the church building being constructed in 1832. A new brick building was constructed in 1836 at the site of the present church building, but was torn down thirteen years later.

In early 1860, prominent members of the church raised a sum of $12,000 to construct a permanent church. The new church was dedicated on September 16 that year and construction was finished in 1861. The new building is "in Gothic style; having buttresses exteriorly and having a steeple which rises 120 feet from the ground". The original sanctuary and bell tower remains to this day.

== Merger into the United Methodist Church ==
Throughout its foundation, until 1939, the congregation in Franklin was known as the Methodist Episcopal Church. During that year the church added the prefix, First, to distinguish itself from other denominations in the area such as the Free Methodist, Bible Methodist, and African Methodist Episcopal Churches. The congregation decided to align with the mainline Methodist Church (USA). On April 23, 1968, the congregation's name officially changed to the Franklin First United Methodist Church when the Methodist Church and the Evangelical United Brethren Church merged to form the United Methodist Church.

== The education building addition and the bell ==
Construction of the 3-story education building was started in 1954 on land to the south and west of the original church. The cost for the addition's construction totaled $109,000, or $950,000 in today's (2014) buying power.

The first bell was donated to the church in the early 1830s by Ransom Seely Lockwood. A second bell was purchased in 1841 to replace Lockwood's bell which had been damaged over the years. The present bell was installed in 1862 and manufactured by the G. W. Coffin & Co. Buckeye Bell Foundry of Cincinnati.
