= First United Methodist Church (Laurel, Maryland) =

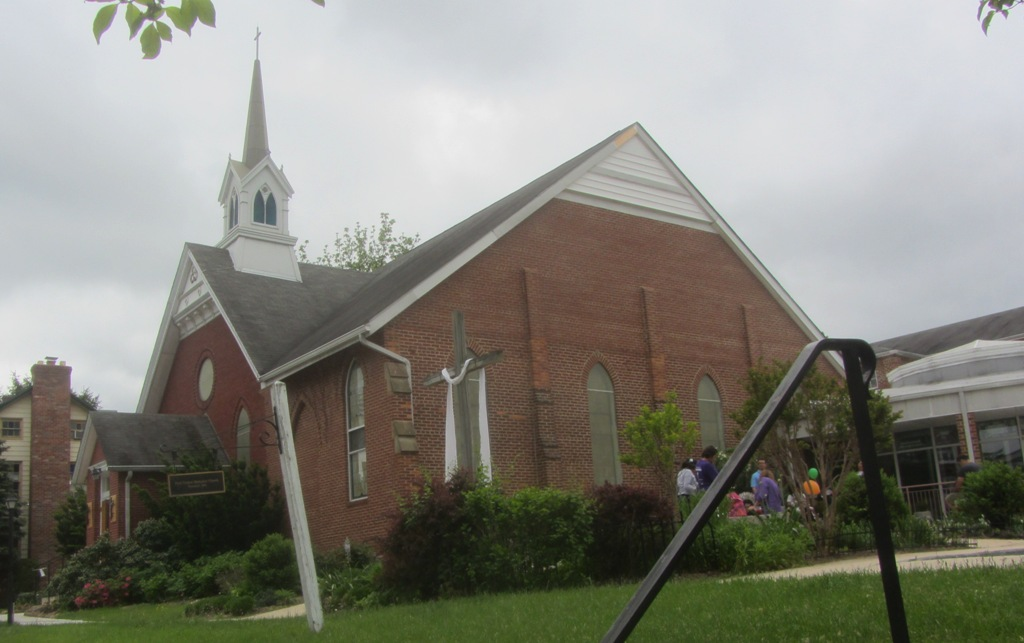
- May 2015

General information
- Location: Laurel, Maryland, US
- Completed: 1884

The First United Methodist Church of Laurel is a member of the Baltimore/Washington Conference of the United Methodist Church. It is located on Main Street in the historic district of Laurel, Maryland. The church serves primarily the Laurel area including the city of Laurel, northern Prince George's County, western Anne Arundel County, south eastern Howard County and eastern Montgomery County. The Rev. Dr. Ramon E. McDonald, II has served the church as its Senior Pastor since July 2012.

== History ==
On March 11, 1840, a group worshiping In an "upper room of the comer house on Yellow Row" (now Ninth Street) was organized In Laurel In the name of The Methodist Episcopal Church. In 1842, The Laurel Mill Company, established by the Snowden Family, presented a "gift of stone and a grant of land" to those early Methodists as a site for their first meeting house. Known as Old Stone Church, It became the first house of worship In Laurel. It was set back from Ninth Street between Montgomery and Main streets. Its ruins were bulldozed away In the 1950s.

Laurel Methodists later split when slavery became an issue and The Methodist Episcopal Church, South, came into being. In 1866 the so-called Southern Methodists in Laurel built their own church on Main Street opposite Seventh Street. It was known as the Frame Church to distinguish it from the old Stone Church. They moved in 1912 into a new church on Montgomery Street between Sixth and Seventh Streets. It was known as Trinity M.E. Church, South.

Old Stone Church continued to house The Methodist Episcopal Church members until 1884 when they moved into a new sanctuary at 424 Main Street. It was named Centenary M.E. Church in commemoration of the 100th anniversary of the founding of Methodism In America. Trinity and Centenary continued to worship separately until October 5, 1941, when the two congregations began joint worship in the Centenary church.

Mergers among Methodist and other churches caused the local church to change its name from Centenary Methodist Episcopal to First Methodist Church and later to First United Methodist Church.

== Building ==
The original church on Main Street was 30 feet wide and 50 feet deep. In 1909 the east wing was added; a vestibule was built; major additions were made in 1953 and 1962 to expand education and fellowship facilities; and property was acquired on the southeast comer of Fifth and Main streets for parking facilities. In recent years, the chancel area has been changed; air conditioning installed in the sanctuary and the floor replaced, and facilities for the disabled provided. Further expansion of the Sanctuary and education wing began with a ground breaking ceremony on April 25, 1999. Completion of the project took nearly two years. On Sunday, February 18, 2001, First UMC celebrated the completion of the newly renovated Sanctuary with a worship service.
