= Baylor Research and Innovation Collaborative =

US research facility

Coordinates: 31.5706°N 97.1064°W

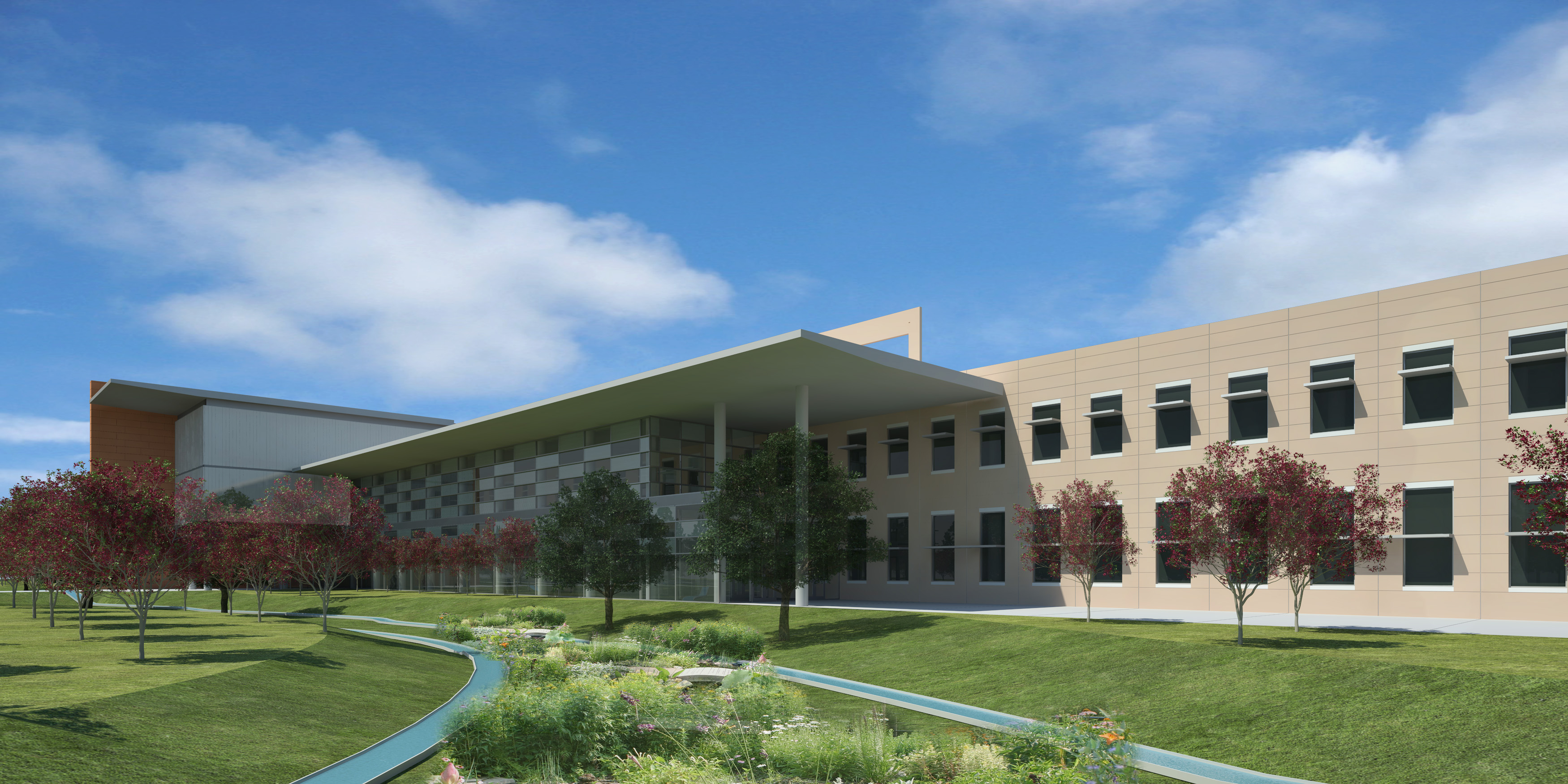

The Baylor Research and Innovation Collaborative is a science research facility. It is the first, and cornerstone, facility of a 21-acre discovery complex that is expected to evolve into the Central Texas Technology and Research Park. Originally a General Tire manufacturing facility, the building and surrounding area are due to be renovated to provide 300,000 square feet of physical space for labs, research centers, industry collaborative space and workforce training.

== History ==
In October 2009, a group of state, county and city governments and organizations and higher educational institutions in Central Texas announced the creation of the Central Texas Technology and Research Park, and the park's first project, the Baylor Research and Innovation Collaborative on South Loop Drive in Waco. Funding for the effort came from the state of Texas and Baylor University. Clifton Robinson is a member of Baylor's Board of Regents. He donated the facility to support the research collaborative. Architectural services were provided by Perkins + Will.

== Funding stakeholders ==
The primary funding sources include:

- Baylor University
- Texas State Technical College
- McLennan County, Texas
- Waco, Texas
- Bellmead, Texas
- Greater Waco Chamber of Commerce
- Cooper Foundation
