= John C. Hope =

American politician

John Christian Hope

Representative for the County of Lexington, South Carolina House of Representatives

Senator for the County of Lexington, South Carolina Senate

Personal details
- Born: August 20, 1806 Newberry District, South Carolina
- Died: July 9, 1879 (aged 72) Hope Station, Pomaria, Newberry County, South Carolina
- Spouse: Louisa Catherine Eichleberger

John Christian Hope (August 20, 1806 – July 9, 1879) was a Lutheran scholar, priest, secretary and president of the South Carolina Lutheran Seminary, Representative, and Senator in his native state of South Carolina.

J.C. Hope was born in Newberry District, South Carolina to Johann Christian Haupt and Christina Fellers. Johann Haupt was the son of a Hessian American Revolution veteran. J.C. Hope and Louisa Eichleberger had three children, James Cornelius (August 23, 1834 - July 17, 1909), Mary Ann Catherine (February 14, 1835 - August 22, 1874) and John Julius (September 26, 1840 - December 20, 1852).

== Lutheran studies ==
J.C. Hope rode on horseback to Gettysburg, Pennsylvania during the late 1820s or early 1830s. He enrolled as a student at the Gettysburg Seminary. He was encouraged to attend by John Bachman. There he studied under Dr. Ernest Lewis Hazelius. About Hazelius he wrote in a letter to Rev. Bachman:

Humility is a striking attribute of his, yes, when spirits, far less noble, would traverse the highest summits, his is moving in the lowest valley. And, though he can soar to the highest summits of the intellectual world, yet, he delights to move in the most inferior vales of wit.

== Church service ==
John Christian Hope graduated from the Seminary in 1831. He was ordained in 1832. He served the following churches.

- St. Stephen's, Lexington, 1831–1834
- St Michaels's, Columbia, 1834
- Ebenezer, Columbia
- Sandy Run, Swansea, 1832–1833
- Colony, Newberry, 1850–1851
- St. Luke's, Prosperity
- St. Matherw's, Pomaria, 1838–1843
- St. John's, Pomaria, 1843–1850
- Bethlehem, Pomaria, 1832–1837
- St. Paul's, Pomaria, 1834–1838
- St. Peter's, Piney Woods
- St. Johns, Lexington
