= Suwanee First United Methodist Church =

Methodist church in Suwannee, Georgia

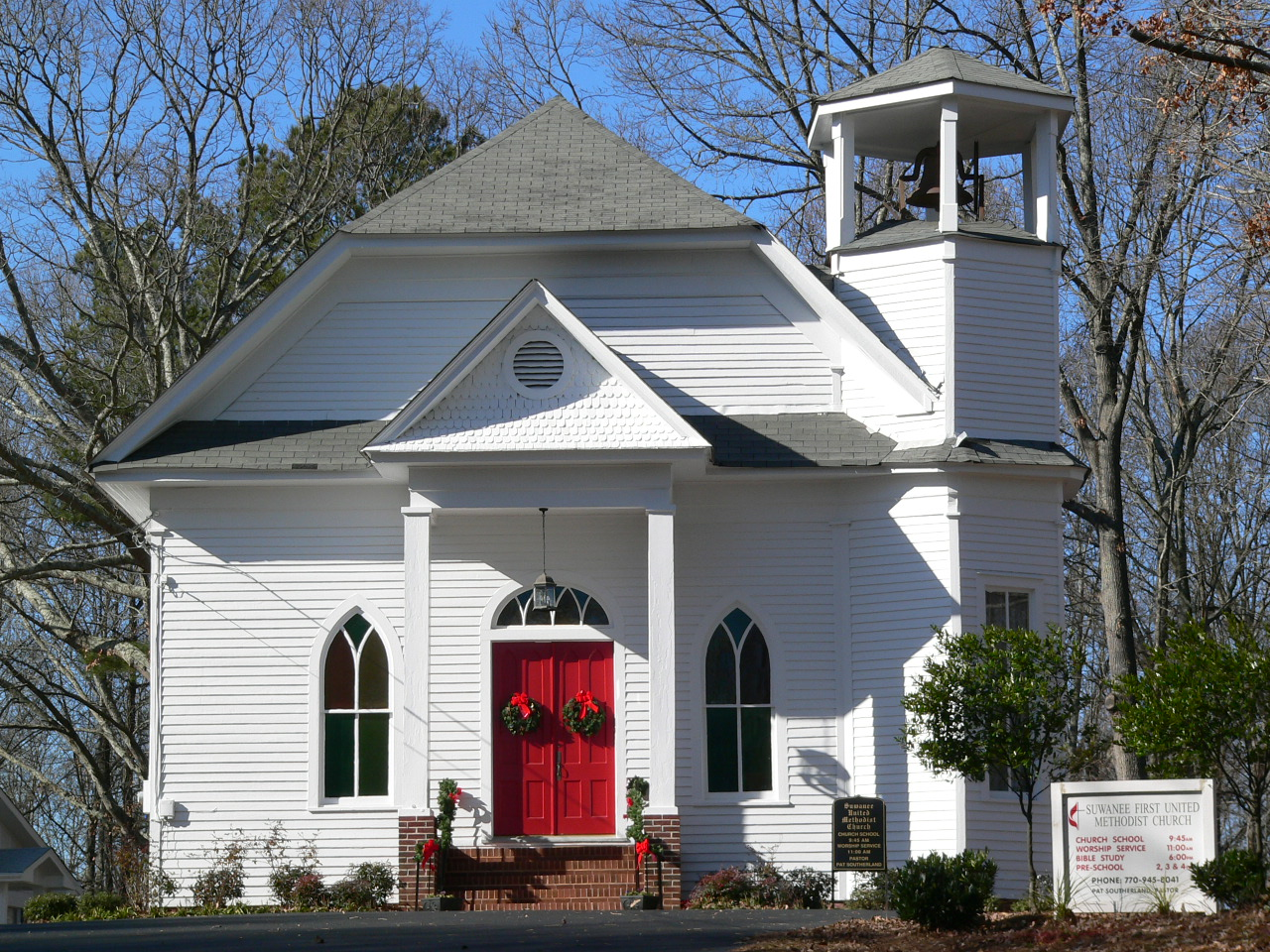
- The church in 2009

Religion
- Affiliation: United Methodist
- District: North Georgia Annual Conference
- Leadership: Rev. Heechul Park
- Status: Active

Location
- Location: 603 Scales Road NW; Suwanee, Georgia, U.S.
- Interactive map of Suwanee First United Methodist Church
- Coordinates: 34.0530°N 84.0745°W

Architecture
- Architect: M. Gus Jones
- Groundbreaking: 1909
- Completed: 1910

Website
- suwaneechurch.org

Suwanee First United Methodist Church is a Methodist church in Suwanee, Georgia. Organized in 1873, it was the first established congregation in the city. The current church building was completed in 1910.

== History ==
The congregation was established in 1873 as the first church in Suwanee, Georgia. The church was built in 1879 and called Suwanee Methodist Church, originally serving as a place of worship for both the Methodist and Baptist communities in Suwanee. It was built by E. S. Brodgon.

The church's structure was destroyed during a windstorm in 1909, at which time the board of trustees chose to relocate and rebuild the church. Originally located on the west end of Main Street, the new church was constructed in 1910 on the top of the hill along Scales Road, which gave the it the nickname "the Church on the Hill". The new church was built by M. Gus Jones for $2,000 using lumber salvaged from the windstorm by Charlie Craft and an ox team.

Three additional classrooms for teaching religious studies were constructed by 1952 and, by 1960, the congregation had seventy members. Previously having part time and traveling pastors, the congregation hired its first full-time pastor in 1974.

The church is under the jurisdiction of the North Georgia Annual Conference of the United Methodist Church.
