= HowTo.tv =

Instructional video website

- Screenshot of HowTo.tv's homepage
- Company type: Limited liability company
- Website type: Video hosting service
- Headquarters: London, {{{location_country}}}
- Website: www.howto.tv
- Launched: June 4, 2007; 19 years ago
- Current status: Defunct

HowTo.tv was a video website that hosted instructional, brand-sponsored, videos on how to accomplish certain tasks, such as how to tie a tie or how to apply makeup. Users were able to view the videos directly on the website or download them to their mobile phone or iPod.

== Background ==
HowTo.tv founders argue that instructional videos are a more efficient way to reach to customers than traditional advertising.

Thus, founder Howard Kosky told The Guardian, "the only people we would expect to go and view how to repair a bicycle puncture will be those people who have a bicycle and have a puncture, for a company like Halfords that's a very, very highly indexed pound as invested as there's zero wastage."

== Affiliations ==
L'Oréal, Wilkinson Sword, RWE npower, among others showcased their videos on HowTo.tv.

The company also conducted marketing research.
