= First United Methodist Church (Nebraska City, Nebraska) =

Church in Nebraska City, Nebraska, United States

Coordinates: 40°40′39″N 95°51′26″W

The First United Methodist Church of Nebraska City, Nebraska was organized in 1854. Previously, Reverend W. D. Gage had Methodist services in the area. The church's main hall is named after Rev. Gage. The land was bought in 1855 and the one-room church was built the same year. Since then, several expansions have made the church larger with several conference rooms, Gage Hall, and the main sanctuary. The building is currently the oldest Methodist church in the state of Nebraska.
