= First United Methodist Church (Reno, Nevada) =

Historic church in Nevada, United States

- U.S. National Register of Historic Places
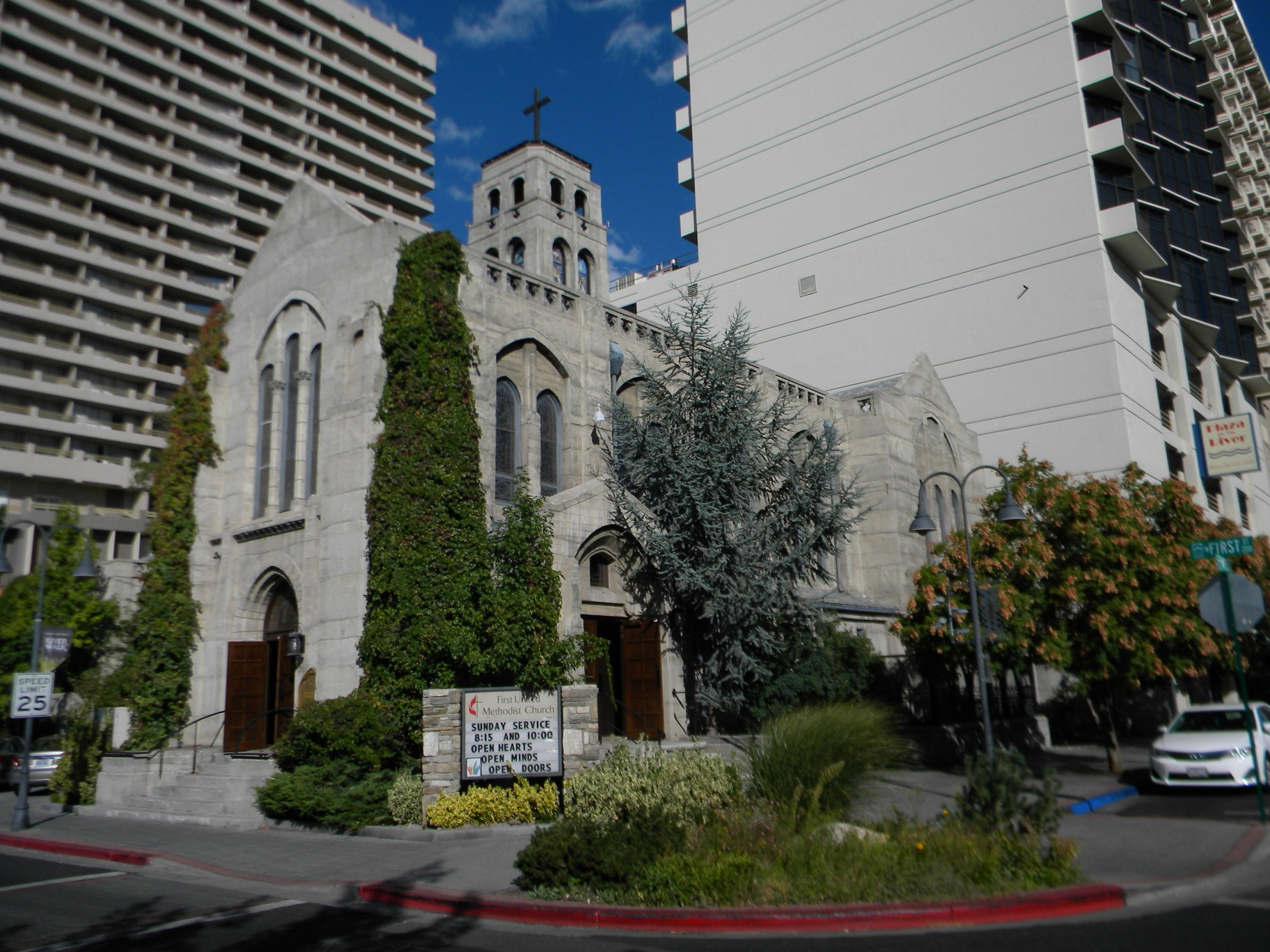

- Location within Nevada Location within the United States
- Location: W. 1st and West Sts., Reno, Nevada
- Coordinates: 39°31′31″N 119°48′53″W
- Area: 0.3 acres (0.12 ha)
- Built: 1925-26
- Architect: Wythe, Blaine, & Olson
- Architectural style: Late Gothic Revival
- NRHP reference No.: 83001115
- Added to NRHP: February 24, 1983

The First United Methodist Church is a Methodist church that was founded in 1868 in Reno, Nevada. In 1868 the first meetings were held in the local schoolhouse on the corner of what is now First and Sierra Streets. In 1871 The first church was erected and dedicated on Sierra Street between First and Second Streets. In the early 1900s the wood-framed church was moved to the back of the lot and a new brick building was added to it. And finally in 1925 plans for a new building were made. Designed by Wythe, Blaken, and Olson of Oakland, the church is one of the first poured concrete buildings in Reno and utilizes Gothic Revival architectural themes. The corner stone for the current historical building was placed in 1926, with the building being dedicated in December of that same year. It was listed on the National Register of Historic Places in 1983; the listing included two contributing buildings. The second building is a parish house designed by local architect Donald Parsons and built in c.1940. In 1965 another addition was done to add on what is currently the fellowship hall, and Sunday school class rooms.

The church's congregation was established in 1868, and its establishment was organized by Thomas McGrath, a Methodist Reverend. At the time it was the first organized church in Reno. The congregation currently has almost 400 members
