= Method (company) =

Global design and engineering firm

- Method
- Formation: 1999
- Founded at: San Francisco, California, United States
- Parent organization: GlobalLogic

Method, Inc. is a global design and engineering firm with offices in New York City, Charlotte, Atlanta, Denver, and London.

== History ==
Method is an international strategic design firm focused at the intersection of brand, product, and service design. Method was created in 1999 by Kevin Farnham, David Lipkin, Patrick Newbery, Mike Abbink, and Meng Mantasoot. First started in San Francisco, Method's founding principle was to use multidisciplinary, multi-platform design thinking to create beautiful and extendable solutions. Method's goal was to be quick to adapt to new technology. Method has approximately 200 employees in 5 offices located in New York City, Charlotte, Atlanta, Denver, and London.

In 1999, the opportunity to work together with Autodesk arose, launching Method. In 2000, Method expanded and opened its New York office in order to accommodate more work. Method's earliest clients were Autodesk, Adobe Systems, Gucci, Palm, MoMA, and Macromedia.

Their international presence was established in 2008 when Method opened its London office.

Method was acquired by the global product development company, GlobalLogic, in September 2011. Together with GlobalLogic, Method provides design and engineering services at scale from over 30 locations across 12 countries.

In May 2021 Method merged with Skookum, a sister GlobalLogic company, to expand their capabilities and footprint. Adding offices in Charlotte, Atlanta, and Denver.

== Notable work ==
Method created the brand identity and initial set top box user interface for OTT startup, Boxee, in 2006. The Boxee work has won the Graphis Gold Award for logo design. Boxee has since been named one of the top 5 Companies That Are Re-Inventing Media by The Huffington Post and named "America's Next Top Gadget" by Appletell.

In 2007, Method launched and redesigned the website for the TED (Technology, Entertainment, Design) Conferences. The conference is very exclusive, and previously only the select TED members had access to the TEDTalks. The website redesign has opened the talks presented at the conference to the public, and offers new browsing and social networking features. TED.com has since won awards from the One Show Interactive, Webbys, OMMA, HOW Interactive, and Pixel, w3, and Communication Arts for Visual Design, Navigation/Structure, Technical Achievement, and Video Sharing. TED was named one of the 50 Best Websites of 2010 by Time magazine, and has received praise from various media outlets, including The New York Times, The Guardian, and Design Week.

In 2009, Method worked with the founders of Aardvark to expand their services into an online offering. Previously, Aardvark was available via instant message and text message. The new website, vark.com, has an infographic that explains how Aardvark works in 3 steps and also encourages people to use the service with a test question. 6 months after the website launched, Aardvark was acquired by Google for $50 million. Aardvark has also won the SXSW Web Award for Community.

Method was the design partner for a leader in social television, Viggle, creating their brand identity, loyalty strategy, and the design for the iPhone application, which in its first year since launch in January, 2012, has surpassed 1.8 million registered users and 151 million check-ins.

In 2014, Method worked with Salesforce to design and develop a new multi-channel online broadcast experience for their 2014 Dreamforce conference. The analytics on the site far surpassed the goal, with 8 million unique viewers from all campaigns, 284k visits to Salesforce LIVE, 608k page views on Salesforce LIVE, and 20 minutes average view time (and 24 minutes average view time to the Channel 1 experience).

To celebrate their 11th anniversary in 2010, Method launched its own content series, 10x10. The 10x10 series covers topics such as cable-cutting, monetization of content, entertainment in the cloud, mobile interfaces, and gaming impact. The series has been well received by the media including The Huffington Post, PSFK, Core77, Cool Hunting, and Fortune. The series currently lives on Method's website and is syndicated by Fast Company Design.

Most recent clients include Stellar, San Francisco Ballet, Lush, Ubisoft, EVRY, Blick, Clear, The Economist, 23andMe, Sage, Gulfstream, Century Link, and WWF.

== Awards ==
Method has won many awards for work since the company began in 1999. Awards include HOW, One Show, Graphis, Rebrand 100, Webby, Pixel, Hub Prize, Interactive Media Awards, Web Visionary Awards, Core 77 Design Awards, Online Media Awards, Lovie, UX Awards, FastCo Innovation Awards, SXSW Interactive Awards, Cannes Lions, Design Week, A'Design Awards, and Design Effectiveness Awards.

Winning work includes Viggle, Reuters The Wider Image app, TED, Cinereach, Horse & Country TV, PBS Video, Boxee, San Francisco International Film Festival, Comcast Fancast, SFMOMA, Coda, LUSH, Nike, San Francisco Ballet, Dalton Maag, Salesforce, TeachingChannel.org, Marimekko, Reuters, and Coda.
