= First United Methodist Church (Farmington, Michigan) =

- First Methodist Episcopal Church of Farmington
- U.S. National Register of Historic Places
- Michigan State Historic Site
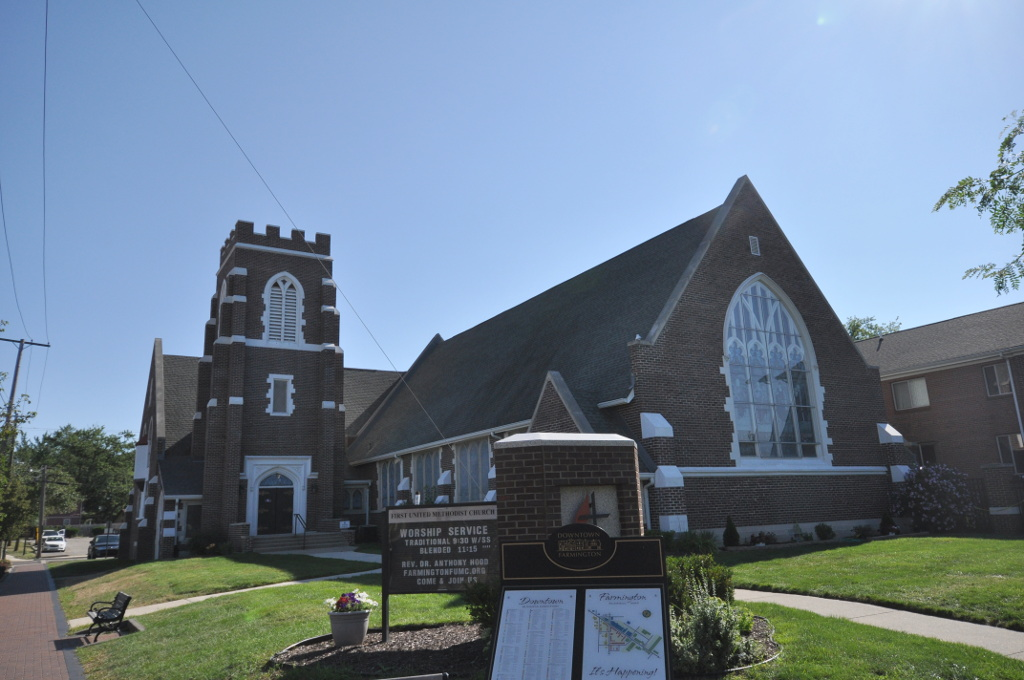
- Interactive map
- Location: 33112 Grand River Ave., Farmington, Michigan
- Coordinates: 42°27′51″N 83°22′25″W
- Built: 1921
- Architect: Butterfield and Butterfield
- Architectural style: Late Gothic Revival
- Website: farmingtonfumc.org
- NRHP reference No.: 14000512
- Added to NRHP: August 25, 2014

The First United Methodist Church is a church located at 33112 Grand River Avenue in Farmington, Michigan. It was listed on the National Register of Historic Places in 2014.

== History ==
The first Methodist circuit riders came to the Farmington area in 1827, and a small congregation was formed in 1829. The first permanent church for the Methodist congregation was built in 1840-44 on Shiawassee Street, and expanded in 1878, when the church had 135 members. By 1919 the congregation began looking for a site to construct a new building. This site was selected for a new building, but before construction was even begun, the 1844 church burned. The congregation met at another church until the new building could be completed.

The church selected the Detroit firm of Butterfield and Butterfield to design the church. The Butterfields lived in Farmington and attended the Methodist Church. Ground was broken in 1921., and the church completed in 1922. The new contained both a sanctuary and a separate large auditorium with stage for community events; the church was soon the center of the Farmington community. The congregation continued to grow as people moved into Farmington, and by 1958 there were nearly 900 members.

The church completed a new high school in 1953 and a new education wing in 1958. In 1961 the sanctuary and community room were altered, and in 2000 an addition was constructed on the side of the education wing. The congregation continues to flourish and use the building.

== Description ==
The First United Methodist Church is made up of a 1922 Late Gothic Revival church and an attached, non-contributing, educational wing with an addition. The buildings form an overall U-shaped footprint. The original church is a T-shaped, dark red brick building on a raised basement with a three-story bell tower. It has a steeply pitched gable roof clad with asphalt shingles. The church is divided into two sections: a rectangular gable-roof building that contains the church's sanctuary, and a second gable-roof section forming the head of the T. The bell tower is set in the angle between the two sections, and contains a primary entrance. The exterior has a limestone foundation and limestone water course with Gothic arch openings above containing stained glass windows.

== See also ==
- National Register of Historic Places listings in Oakland County, Michigan
