= Asbury First United Methodist Church =

Coordinates: 43°9′5″N 77°34′33″W

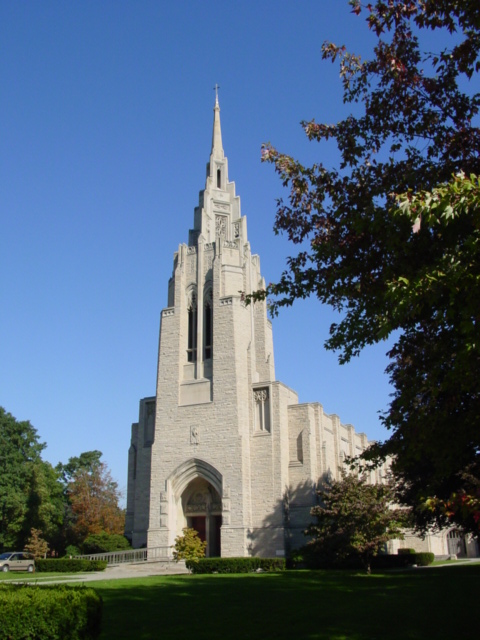
- Asbury First United Methodist Church
- Location: 1050 East Ave. Rochester, NY 14607
- Country: United States
- Denomination: United Methodist Church
- Website: AsburyFirst.org

History
- Founded: 1821(First), 1836(Asbury), 1933(Union)
- Founder: Dr. Weldon Crossland (Pastor 1932-1959)
- Dedicated: 1955

Architecture
- Style: American Gothic

Asbury First United Methodist Church, a Progressive Christian congregation, is located on East Avenue in Rochester, New York, United States. It traces its heritage to several Rochester congregations dating back to the 1820s. In its current form, it is the result of a 1934 merger of First Church and Asbury Methodist Episcopal Church. With a congregation of 2,300 people, it is the largest United Methodist church in the Rochester area. Asbury First UMC welcomes all persons and is affiliated with the Reconciling Congregations Movement.

Asbury First presents an annual concert series featuring regional musicians and national touring groups. The Asbury First Dining and Caring Center serves meals to the homeless; the Asbury First Storehouse provides donated clothing, kitchenware, and bedding. The church also supports a Grocery Bag Ministry, Rochester Area Interfaith Hospitality Network, School 41 tutoring and outreach, and projects in India, Nicaragua, and Kenya.

Located in the East Avenue Historic District, the church property features several historic buildings, including the 1953 Gothic Sanctuary, and 1050 East Ave., also called the Wilson Soule House, a stone edifice that is one of Rochester's finest examples of Richardsonian Romanesque style.

== History ==
=== Origin ===
Asbury First United Methodist Church is the result of the union of two churches and five denominations. The First Wesleyan Methodist Episcopal Church of the village of Rochester was formed in 1821.

==== First Methodist ====
On Sept. 20, 1820 a Methodist Society was legally established in the Village Rochester. In 1821 ground was broken for the first church building, on the west side of South St. Paul Street (now South Avenue) south of Main Street, approximately at the location of the rear right corner of the current Rochester Riverside Convention Center. Completed in 1826, it was built of brick and was described in 1895 newspaper article as “small and unpretentious”. In 1830 a new site for the church was located at the northwest corner of West Main Street and Fitzhugh Street (the future site of the Duffy Powers Department store, now an office building, at 50 West Main Street). On January 5, 1835, this structure was destroyed by fire. Shortly before the fire this congregation had 900 members. After the creation of East Side Methodist in 1836, the remaining First Methodist membership was 300. On January 15, 1839 a replacement First Methodist church was completed and dedicated on the same site. Due to the debt incurred from building two successive church buildings, the building at West Main and Fitzhugh Street was sold in 1854 and abandoned as a church. A lot was secured further north on Fitzhugh Street, at what would be the northwest corner of Fitzhugh and Church Street.

Note: Church Street in Rochester, which runs between State Street and Sophia St. (now known as Exchange Street) was erected in 1883, and ran in between First Methodist on the northwest corner and First Baptist on the southwest corner, with the US Post Office and Federal Building (now Rochester City Hall) on the northeast corner;

Construction of the new building started in 1855 and was completed by 1861.

In 1895, First Methodist decided to tear down their existing building and construct a new church on the site at Church and Fitzhugh,. Architect Arthur B. Jennings of New York City was chosen for the work. The first stage in the reconstruction was the building of a chapel and Sunday school rooms to the rear of the old church, which would serve as a temporary church while the old church was demolished and the new structure built.

This new Sunday School annex and chapel opened in 1895 and fronted 60 feet on Church Street and extended back 120 feet. It was three stories and made of St. Lawrence marble.

In 1900, the Frank Street Methodist Church of Rochester merged into First Methodist.

The new First Methodist Church itself was dedicated in 1901, replacing the former 1855 building and connected to the Chapel and Sunday School building erected four years earlier. The total cost for the church, the chapel and purchase of additional property, was just under $200,000.

In 1933, a fire destroyed the First Methodist Church building.

==== Asbury Methodist ====
In 1836, a portion of the congregation of First Methodist formed the Second Methodist Church, meeting in the old Methodist church building on South St. Paul (now South Avenue). The new church was called the East Side Society of the Methodist Episcopal Church in Rochester.

Second Methodist was renamed St. John's Church in 1844 and became known as Asbury Methodist in 1861. In 1844 the church was located at the southeast corner of East Main Street and South Clinton Avenue.

Both First and Asbury survived hard depressions in the 1840s and 1850s to remain strong influences in the city. A strong Sunday School was developed early, and has continually been a feature of Asbury, First, and Asbury First Churches.

In 1866, Asbury Church purchased a pipe organ, the first Methodist Church to include instrumental music in a service.

A new Asbury Methodist Church was erected at East Avenue and Anson Park in 1885. The architect was A. J. Warner. The total cost of the building was $70,000, a sum raised before the building was dedicated, leaving it debt-free. In the rear of the new church was the Sunday School building, which was the former East Avenue Baptist Church, also known as Second Baptist. The seating capacity was 1,000, including the gallery. The auditorium was set up in a semi-circle, with the floor sloping toward the pulpit.

==== Merger ====
In 1933, a few months after the fire that destroyed the First Methodist Church, a merger was completed between Asbury and First Methodist Churches.

==== Moved to 1050 east avenue ====
The combined membership of Asbury and First Methodist was over 2,000 and a new church building was needed. Property was purchased in 1943 at 1010 and 1040 East Avenue and the house at 1050 East Avenue in 1950. Groundbreaking for the new church building was in 1953, and the new church dedicated in 1955.

== Beliefs ==
=== Marriage ===
The church has an inclusive vision and celebrates both opposite-sex marriages and same-sex marriages.

== Campus Architecture ==
The present church building was constructed in 1953-55 in the American Gothic style. The education wing was added in 1961. The stained glass windows were designed by George Haushalter. The construction and style owes much to the dedication of Dr. Weldon Crossland, minister for 28 years.

Two mansions are also part of the campus. 1050 East Ave (The Wilson Soule House) is considered one of the most important 19th century houses surviving in Rochester; it was built in 1890. From 1894 to 1905 George Eastman and his mother lived in the house. Eastman had a darkroom constructed in the basement (now the Asbury First Storehouse) and made other changes to the interior. The building now houses the church's administrative offices. 1010 East Avenue was built in 1907 in a Tudor style, and now houses the Dining and Caring Center and church meeting rooms.
