= First United Methodist Church (Elyria, Ohio) =

Historic church in Ohio, United States

- U.S. National Register of Historic Places
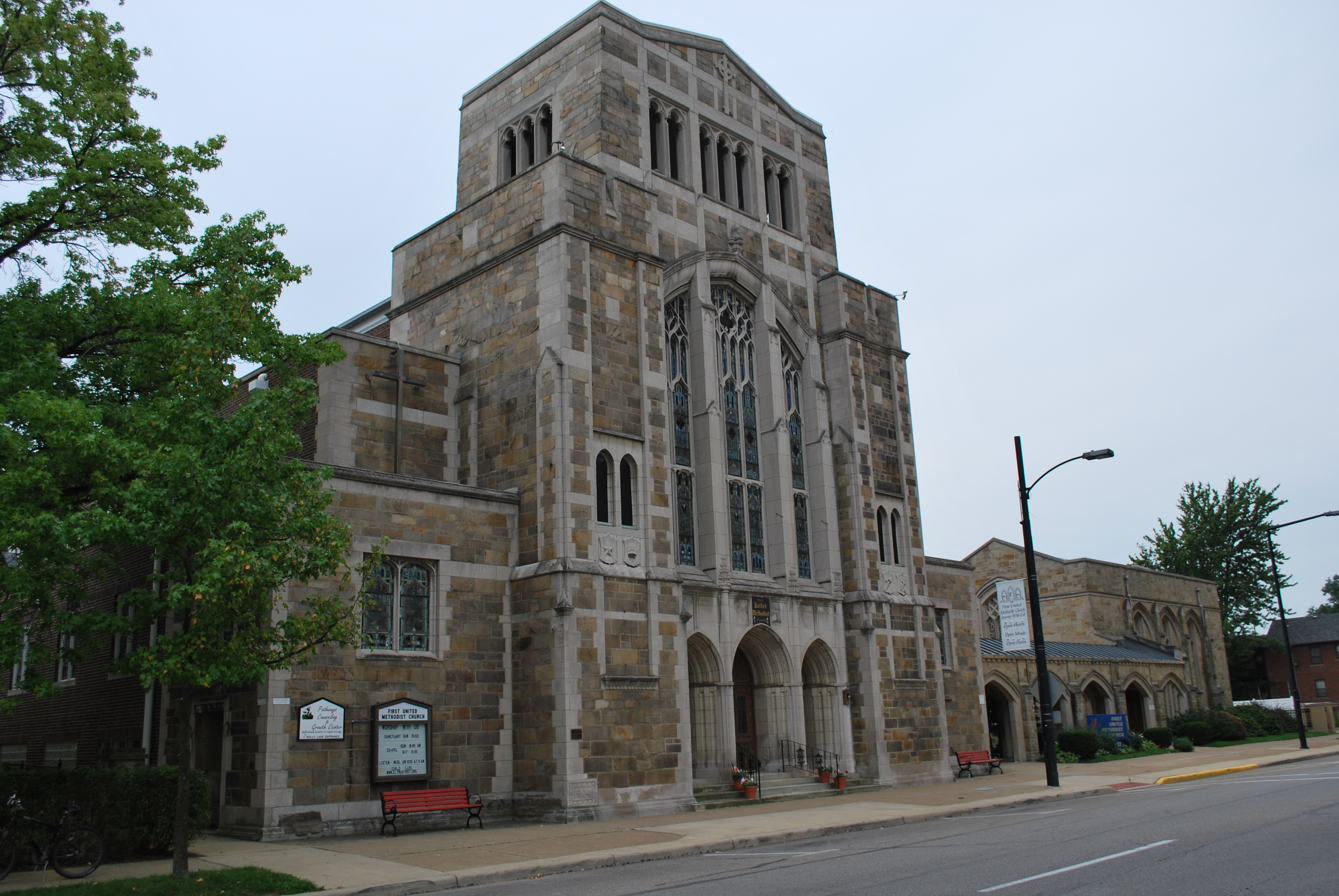

- Location within Ohio Location within the United States
- Location: 312 3rd St., Elyria, Ohio
- Coordinates: 41°21′54″N 82°6′28″W
- Area: less than one acre
- Built: 1925
- Architect: Thayer & Johnson
- Architectural style: Gothic Revival
- MPS: Elyria MRA
- NRHP reference No.: 79002730
- Added to NRHP: August 13, 1979

First United Methodist Church is a historic Methodist church at 312 3rd Street in Elyria, Ohio.

It was built in 1925 and added to the National Register in 1979.
