= Methodist Hospital =

Methodist Hospital is the name of numerous medical institutions.

- Indiana University Health Methodist Hospital, Indianapolis, Indiana
- Houston Methodist Hospital, Houston, Texas
- Methodist Dallas Medical Center, Dallas, Texas
- Methodist Hospital (San Antonio), San Antonio, Texas
- Methodist Hospital (Jacksonville), Jacksonville, Florida
- Methodist Hospital (Omaha, Nebraska), Omaha, Nebraska
- Methodist Hospital (Philadelphia), Philadelphia, Pennsylvania
- Methodist Hospital of Sacramento, Sacramento, California
- Methodist University Hospital, Memphis, Tennessee
- New York Methodist Hospital, Brooklyn, New York
- Rochester Methodist Hospital, owned by Mayo Clinic, Rochester, Minnesota

== See also ==
- List of hospitals in Florida
- List of hospitals in Illinois
- List of hospitals in Indiana
- List of hospitals in Kentucky
- List of hospitals in Minnesota
- List of hospitals in Nebraska
- List of hospitals in Texas
