= Searcy First Methodist Church =

Historic church in Arkansas, United States

- U.S. National Register of Historic Places
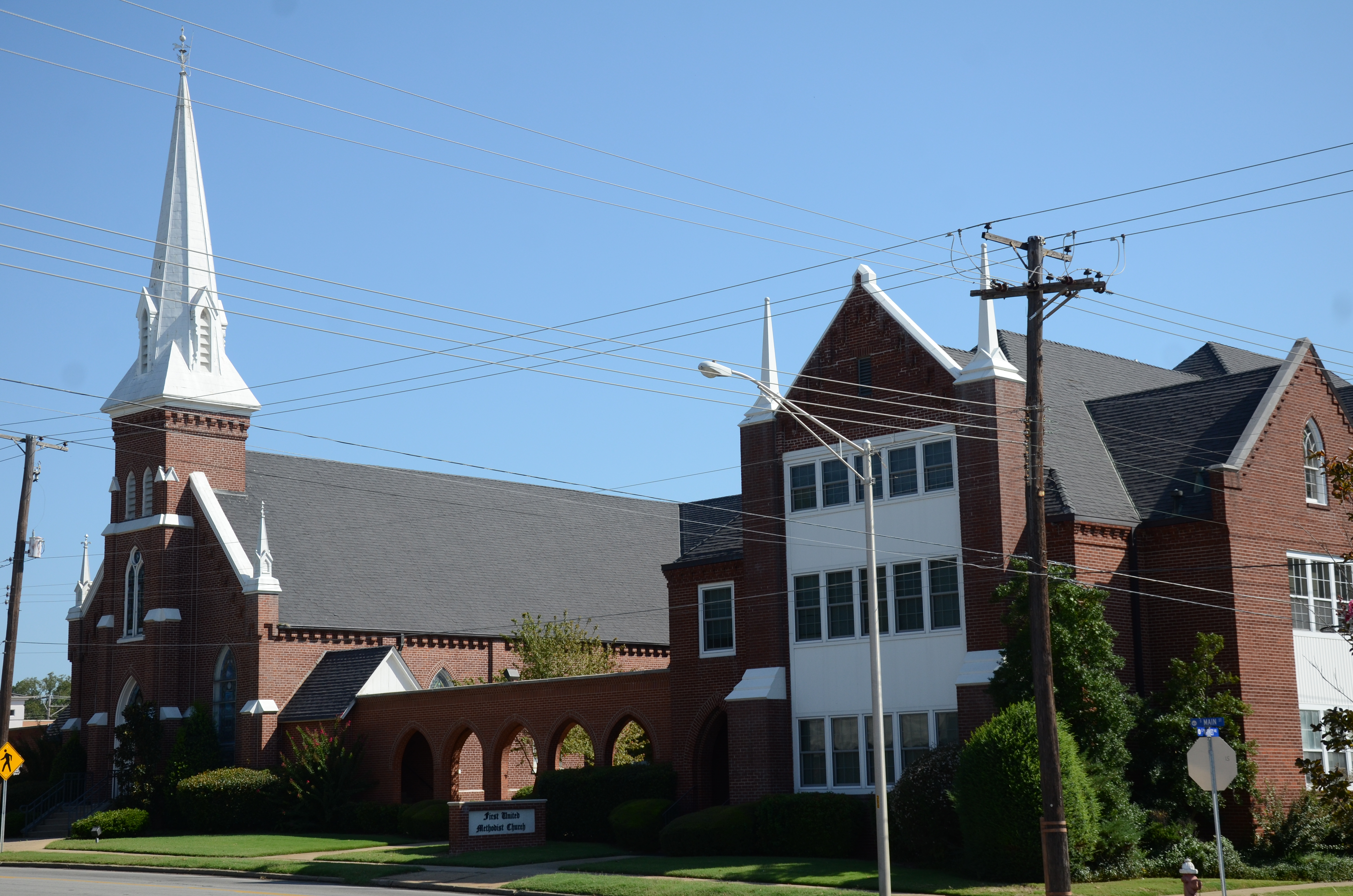

- Location within Arkansas Location within the United States
- Location: Jct. of Main and Market Sts., Searcy, Arkansas
- Coordinates: 35°15′0″N 91°44′9″W
- Area: less than one acre
- Built: 1877
- Architectural style: Gothic, Gothic Revival, English Gothic Revival
- MPS: White County MPS
- NRHP reference No.: 91001206
- Added to NRHP: July 12, 1992

Searcy First Methodist Church is a historic church at the junction of Main and Market Streets in Searcy, Arkansas, United States. It is a large single-story brick structure, with a front-facing gable and square tower projecting from the front. It has English Gothic massing with Late Victorian decorative elements, including buttressing, lancet-arch stained-glass windows, and a main entrance with a stained-glass lancet transom. The church was built in 1872, and is the only example of English Gothic architecture in White County.

The church was listed on the National Register of Historic Places in 1992. In 2022, the congregation disaffiliated from the United Methodist Church.

Searcy First Methodist Church's ministry focuses on four main areas: Engaging in Ministry with the Poor, Improving Global Health, Developing Principled Christian Leaders and Creating New and Renewed Congregations. Narrowing their focus to these four areas allows churches to use their resources effectively as they live out God's vision for the church. Searcy First is a Christian-based worship center with an obligation to bear a faithful Christian witness to Jesus Christ, the living reality at the center of the Church's life and witness. To fulfill this obligation, they reflect critically on biblical and theological inheritance, striving to express faithfully the witness we make in today's time.

== See also ==
- National Register of Historic Places listings in White County, Arkansas
