= First United Presbyterian Church (Athens, Tennessee) =

Historic church in Tennessee, United States

- U.S. National Register of Historic Places
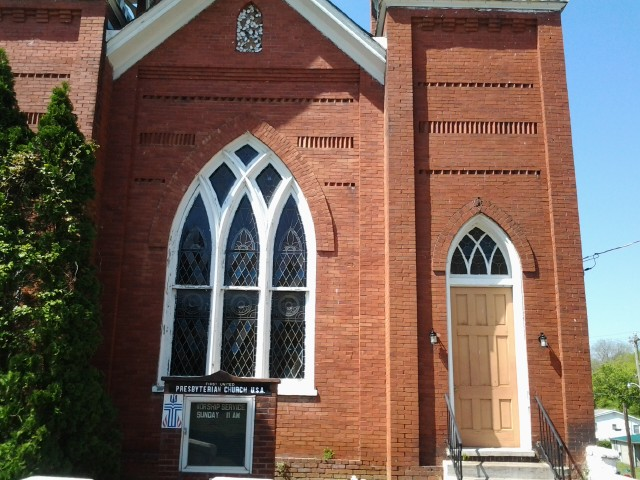

- Location within Tennessee Location within the United States
- Location: 321 N. Jackson St., Athens, Tennessee
- Coordinates: 35.44663°N 84.59629°W
- Area: 0.3 acres (0.12 ha)
- Built: 1892
- Architect: Sherman, Rodger; et al.
- Architectural style: Gothic Revival
- NRHP reference No.: 08000701
- Added to NRHP: July 24, 2008

First United Presbyterian Church is a historic African-American church at 321 N. Jackson Street in Athens, Tennessee.

The church was established in 1889 or 1890 as a mission church, led by minister Jacob L. Cook. Cook, a native of Athens and the son of former slaves, had attended Fisk University as a member of the Fisk Jubilee Singers, then went on to graduate from Knoxville College. In 1888 he traveled north to study for the Presbyterian ministry at the United Presbyterian Church's Allegheny Theological Seminary in Pittsburgh, Pennsylvania. He returned to Athens and started a new congregation in a building that also served as a dance hall. The current church building was built and furnished in 1892 with assistance from sponsors in Pennsylvania. The interior seating, which is still in the church, came from an opera house.

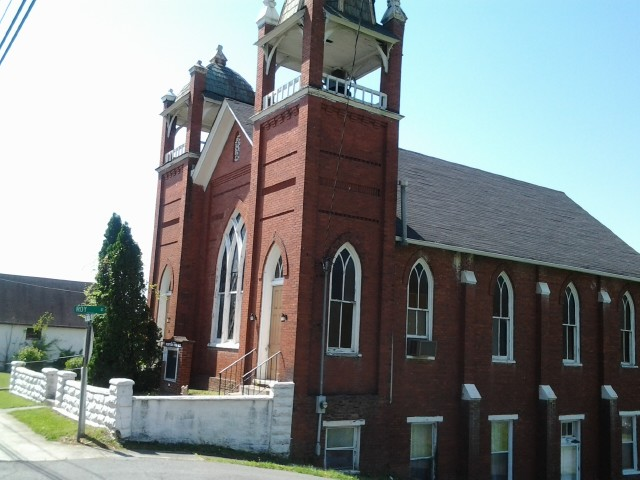
Side view of the church

The building was added to the National Register of Historic Places in 2008. In October 2013 the Tennessee Preservation Trust named it to its annual "Ten in Tennessee" list of endangered historic properties in the state.
