= First United Methodist Church (Catlettsburg, Kentucky) =

Historic church in Kentucky, United States

- U.S. National Register of Historic Places
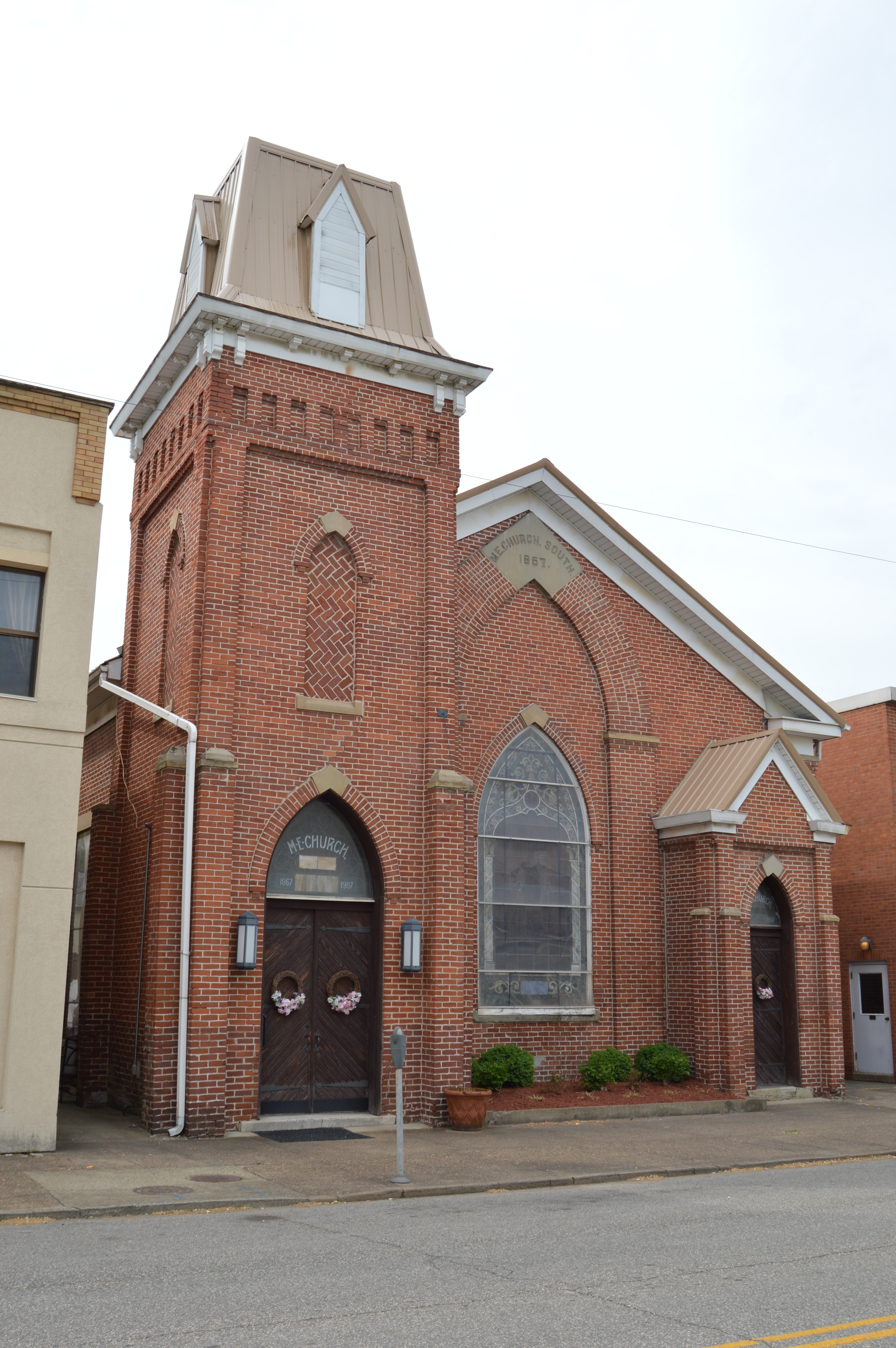
- Front of the church

- Location within Kentucky Location within the United States
- Location: 2712 Louisa St., Catlettsburg, Kentucky
- Coordinates: 38°24′26″N 82°35′53″W
- Area: 0 acres (0 ha)
- Built: 1867
- NRHP reference No.: 74000853
- Added to NRHP: November 19, 1974

First United Methodist Church (also called First Methodist Episcopal Church) is a historic church at 2712 Louisa Street in Catlettsburg, Kentucky.

It was built in 1867 and added to the National Register of Historic Places in 1974.

== See also ==
- National Register of Historic Places listings in Kentucky
