= First United Methodist Church (Fairview, Oklahoma) =

- U.S. National Register of Historic Places
- Location within Oklahoma Location within the United States
- Location: 118 N 7th, Fairview, Oklahoma
- Coordinates: 36°16′09″N 98°28′38″W
- Area: less than one acre
- Built: 1939
- Built by: Leon Leon
- Architect: John C. Hope
- Architectural style: Late Gothic Revival
- NRHP reference No.: 10000624
- Added to NRHP: September 3, 2010

The First United Methodist Church at 118 N. 7th in Fairview, Oklahoma is a historic church built in 1939. It was listed on the National Register of Historic Places in 1983. There is a Fairview First United Methodist Church located at 811 E. Elm Street in Fairview, suggesting that the church congregation has moved.
