= First Methodist Church of Waco =

- First Methodist Church of Waco
- 31.544311°N 97.195483°W
- Country: United States
- Denomination: Global Methodist Church
- Website: firstwaco.com

History
- Former names: First Methodist Church; First United Methodist Church
- Status: Church
- Founded: 1 April 1850
- Founder: Rev. Joseph Perkins Sneed
- Dedicated: 1 March 1963

Architecture
- Functional status: Active
- Groundbreaking: 1962
- Completed: 1963

First Methodist Church of Waco is multi-site Global Methodist church in Waco, Texas. Its main campus is at 4901 Cobbs Drive in Waco. It was formerly a United Methodist Church.

== Background ==
In 1850, the Rev. Joseph Perkins Sneed, founded the church where Jackson Street met the Brazos River. In 1858, the first church was built at Franklin Avenue and Third Street.

In the summer of 1851, the Methodists built a church of wood planks at Second and Jackson. The Baptists and Presbyterians also shared this building while they built their congregations. At the Texas Conference for 1851 that was held at Bastrop, Waco was officially recognized by having Pleasant M. Yell appointed as pastor. A new brick church was built in 1858 at Franklin and Third Streets.

In 1867, a cornerstone was laid for 5th Street Methodist Episcopal Church South, 5th and Jackson. In 1919 the church name became First Methodist Church.

When Rev. Comer was appointed to First Methodist in 1936, the church was heavily in debt. When he left in 1946 to go into evangelistic work, the debt had been paid and there was money in the bank.

In 1962, ground was broken on a new church site (the current site) in Northwest Waco on land that was donated by D.T. Janes family. The current church was dedicated in March 1963.

On March 31, the first services were held at the new church. The steeple was added at a later time, around 1977. The 1876 cornerstone has a prominent place in the history corner of the church foyer.

In 1984 a new 1,200 seat sanctuary was opened with two consecration services to accommodate the crowd. It took 18 months to build.

From 1968-1994 Rev. Richard Freeman, served a record of 25 years building First United Methodist. This is an unusual length of time for Methodist ministers to be assigned to a specific church. The membership grew from 1,520 members to 3,397 members.

Dr Richard G. Penna was appointed to First United Methodist Church in 1994. History was made on June 6, 1996 when Rev. Sharon D. Robertson was appointed to First United Methodist Church at Central Texas Conference. As the first woman to serve as a pastor of FUMC, she was an integral part of all of its ministries as associate pastor.

In 1997 Rev. Stephen K. Ramsdell was appointed to First United Methodist Church in 1997 and preached his first sermon on May 4, 1997. In 2003 renovations were made to add a Family Life Center and Chapel. Renovations to the new Children’s Worship Center were also completed. Rev. Ramsdell retired in 2017 and Rev Ryan Barnett is appointed to First United Methodist Church. In 2019, the church formally merged with downtown Waco's Austin Avenue United Methodist Church. In 2022 First United Methodist Church left the United Methodist Conference and joined the newly formed Global Methodist Conference.

In May 2025, Rev. Dr. Mike Voigts became the senior pastor, having previously served as a professor at Asbury Theological Seminary.

As of August 31, 2025, the Downtown Campus separated to become its own church.

== See also ==
- National Register of Historic Places listings in McLennan County, Texas
