= First United Church (Swift Current) =

- First United Church
- 50.2853°N 107.7955°W
- Location: 223 3rd Avenue NE; Swift Current, Saskatchewan; S9H 2G6
- Country: Canada
- Denomination: United Church of Canada
- Previous denomination: Presbyterian
- Website: https://firstunitedsc.ca/

Architecture
- Functional status: Active
- Architectural type: Gothic Revival style

First United Church (formerly the Knox Presbyterian Church from 1913 to 1943) is a designated municipal heritage property. It was originally built in 1916, at a cost of $25,000 to house the Presbyterian denomination. In 1943, after the Swift Current Metropolitan Methodist Church burned down, the two congregations merged to form First United Church.

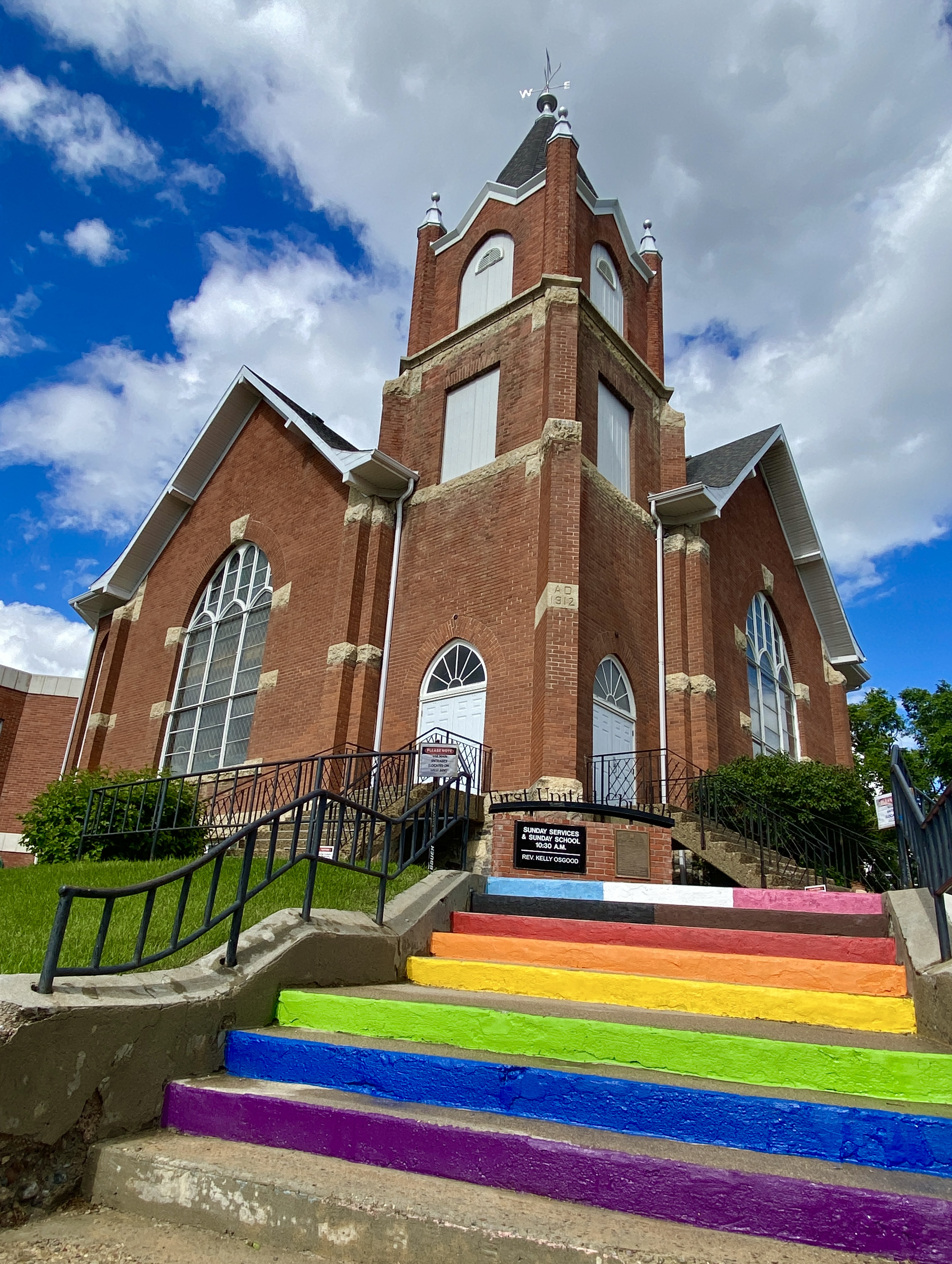
First United Church, Swift Current

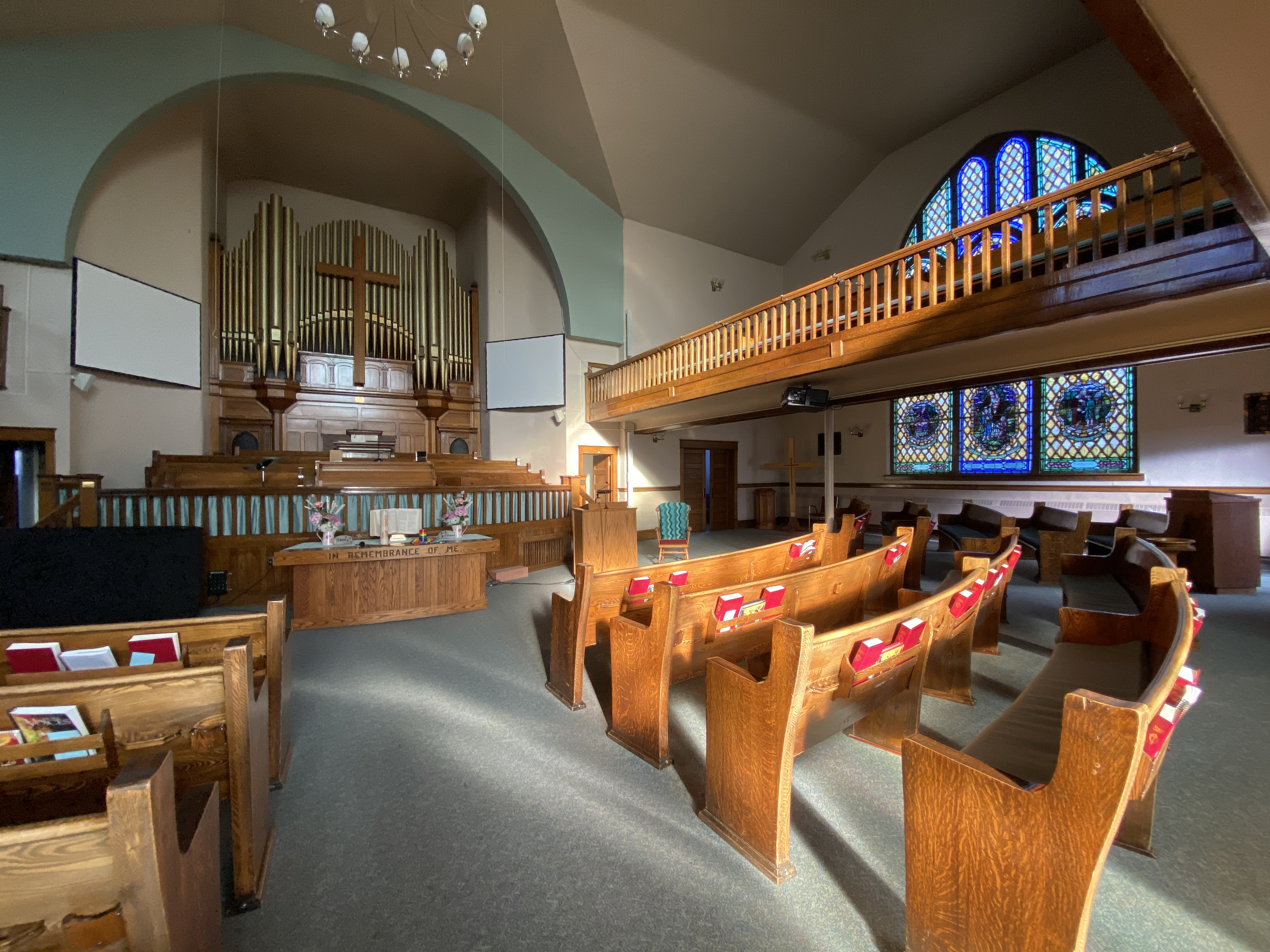
Pipe organ, pews and stain glass windows at First United Church, Swift Current

Pipe organ at First United Church, Swift Current

== See also ==
- United Church of Canada
