= First Methodist Church =

First Methodist Church or variations with Building may refer to:

in the United States

(by state, then city/town)

- First Methodist Church (Lewisville, Arkansas), listed on the National Register of Historic Places (NRHP) in Lafayette County, Arkansas
- First Methodist Church of Oviedo, listed on the NRHP in Seminole County, Florida
- First Methodist Church of St. Petersburg, listed on the NRHP in Pinellas County, Florida
- First Methodist Church (Moscow, Idaho), listed on the NRHP in Latah County, Idaho
- First Methodist Church of Batavia, listed on the NRHP in Kane County, Illinois
- First Methodist Church (Aurora, Indiana), listed on the NRHP in Dearborn County, Indiana
- First Methodist Church (Rock Rapids, Iowa), listed on the NRHP in Lyon County, Iowa
- First United Methodist Church (Paintsville, Kentucky), listed on the NRHP as "First Methodist Church" in Johnson County, Kentucky
- First Methodist Church (Alexandria, Louisiana), listed on the NRHP in Rapides Parish, Louisiana
- First Methodist Church (Clinton, Massachusetts), listed on the NRHP in Worcester County, Massachusetts
- First Methodist Church (Brookhaven, Mississippi), listed on the NRHP in Lincoln County, Mississippi
- First Methodist Church of Greenwood, listed on the NRHP in Leflore County, Mississippi
- First Methodist Church (Tupelo, Mississippi), listed on the NRHP in Lee County, Mississippi
- First Methodist Church (Excelsior Springs, Missouri), listed on the NRHP in Clay County, Missouri
- First Methodist Church of Clovis, listed on the NRHP in Curry County, New Mexico
- First Methodist Church (Cleveland, Ohio), listed on the NRHP in Cuyahoga County, Ohio
- First Methodist Church Building (Atoka, Oklahoma), listed on the NRHP in Atoka County, Oklahoma
- First Methodist Church, Gatlinburg, listed on the NRHP in Sevier County, Tennessee
- First Methodist Church (McMinnville, Tennessee), listed on the NRHP in Warren County, Tennessee
- First Methodist Church (Crockett, Texas), listed on the NRHP in Houston County, Texas
- First Methodist Church (Cuero, Texas), listed on the NRHP in DeWitt County, Texas
- First Methodist Church (Georgetown, Texas), listed on the NRHP in Williamson County, Texas
- First Methodist Church (Marshall, Texas), listed on the NRHP in Harrison County, Texas
- First Methodist Church of Rockwall, listed on the NRHP in Rockwall County, Texas
- First Methodist Church of Burlington, listed on the NRHP in Chittenden County, Vermont
- First Methodist Church (Monroe, Wisconsin), listed on the NRHP in Green County, Wisconsin
- First Methodist Church (Oshkosh, Wisconsin), listed on the NRHP in Winnebago County, Wisconsin
- First Methodist Church (Rhinelander, Wisconsin)
- First Methodist Church (Waukesha, Wisconsin), listed on the NRHP in Waukesha County, Wisconsin

== See also ==
- List of Methodist churches
- First United Methodist Church (disambiguation)
- Methodism (disambiguation)
- The Methodist Church (disambiguation)
