= Hardy House =

Hardy House may refer to:

in the United States (by state then city or town)

- Hardy House (Little Rock, Arkansas), listed on the National Register of Historic Places (NRHP)
- Robert Lee Hardy House, Monticello, Arkansas, NRHP-listed in Drew County
- Hardy House (Makawao, Hawaii), NRHP-listed in Hawaii
- Howard-Hardy House, Louisville, Kentucky, NRHP-listed in downtown Louisville
- Joseph Hardy House, Groveland, Massachusetts, NRHP-listed
- Urias Hardy House, Methuen, Massachusetts, NRHP-listed
- Nahum Hardy House, Waltham, Massachusetts, NRHP-listed
- Capt. Jack C. Hardy House, Brookhaven, Mississippi, NRHP-listed in Lincoln County
- Joseph Giraud House, Reno, Nevada, NRHP-listed in Washoe County, known also as Hardy House
- Clinton-Hardy House, Tulsa, Oklahoma, NRHP-listed in Tulsa County
- Hodges-Hardy-Chambers House, Wichita Falls, Texas, NRHP-listed in Wichita County
- Thomas P. Hardy House, Racine, Wisconsin, a Frank Lloyd Wright house, NRHP-listed in Racine County
