= Sessums =

Sessums may refer to:

== People with the surname ==
- Davis Sessums (1858-1929), American Episcopalian bishop
- J. Kim Sessums, American sculptor
- Kevin Sessums (born 1956), American author
- T. Terrell Sessums (1930-2020), American politician

== Locations ==
- Sessums, Mississippi, unincorporated community in Mississippi, USA
- Sessums Glacier, glacier on the Antarctic
