= Alice Cary McKinney =

American temperance and social reformer (1865 – 1928)

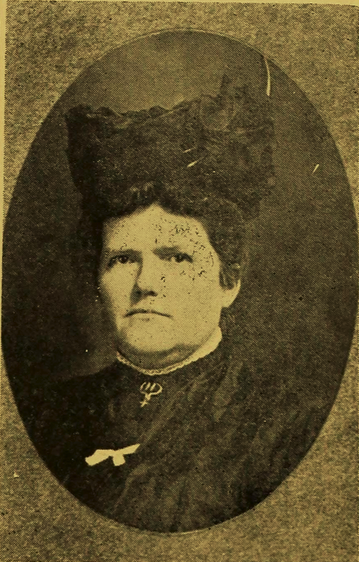
- Portrait photo from The passing of the saloon, 1908
- Born: Alice Cary Sadler; March 20, 1865; Alabama, U.S.
- Died: October 8, 1928 (aged 63); Shreveport, Louisiana, U.S.
- Education: Whitworth Female College
- Occupation: Social reformer
- Known for: President, Louisiana Woman's Christian Temperance Union
- Spouse: John Columbus Haley McKinney (m. 1887)

Alice Cary McKinney (née Sadler; 1865–1928) was an American temperance and social reformer. She served as President of the Louisiana Woman's Christian Temperance Union (WCTU).

== Early life and education ==
Alice Cary Sadler was born in Alabama at Fort Deposit or Pollard, March 20, 1865. Her parents were Francis Wilson Sadler, Jr (b. 1827) and Loretta Cary Crary Sadler (1831-1910). Alice's siblings were: Everett, Olive, John, Ella, Harriet, and Ida.

She was educated in the public schools of Alabama and at Whitworth Female College, Brookhaven, Mississippi.

== Career ==
She left college during her junior year (1884) to teach school in St. Tammany Parish, Louisiana, where she remained until 1886.

Early in life, McKinney had become interested in the temperance movement, and after becoming affiliated with the WCTU, served in almost every capacity in the local county and State bodies, including the editorship of the State WCTU organ, White Ribbon, and the preparation of temperance columns for other publications.

Removing to Ruston, Louisiana, McKinney affiliated with the Louisiana WCTU in which organization she has held successively the offices of district secretary (1903–04), recording secretary (1904–05), corresponding secretary (1906–08), and president (1909, till her death in 1928).

McKinney was also quite active in the promotion of other social and religious uplift movements. For a time, she was parish superintendent (St. Tammany's Parish) of the Temperance Department of the International Sunday School Association. She was a firm advocate of woman suffrage, and made many speeches favoring both that doctrine and Prohibition.

== Personal life ==
In 1887, at Pearl River, Louisiana, she married John Columbus Haley McKinney (1858–1957), of Anguilla, Mississippi. The couple had six children: Conrad, Ethel, Leonox, Gordon, D.L., and Griffin.

The young couple lived near Anguilla, Mississippi for a number of years following their marriage, later moving to Louisiana. The couple settled in Ruston around 1903 where Mr. McKinney engaged in the dairy industry.

McKinney was a member of the Ruston Methodist Church.

She died in a local sanitarium in Shreveport, Louisiana, October 8, 1928, where she had been for ten days undergoing her second blood transfusion in little more than a month.
