= Paxton House (Brookhaven, Mississippi) =

- U.S. National Register of Historic Places
- Location within Mississippi
- Nearest city: Brookhaven, Mississippi vicinity
- Coordinates: 31°37′13″N 90°34′25″W
- Area: less than one acre
- Built: 1831
- Architectural style: dogtrot
- NRHP reference No.: 97000632
- Added to NRHP: June 27, 1997

The Paxton House is a historic house near Brookhaven, Mississippi. It was built as a dogtrot house in 1831 by Benjamin Paxton, and extended in 1858. Paxton lived here with his wife, née Frances Lofton. He owned more than 1013 acres, and he died in 1872. The house was inherited by his descendants. It has been listed on the National Register of Historic Places since June 27, 1997.
