= Inez Hotel =

- U.S. National Register of Historic Places
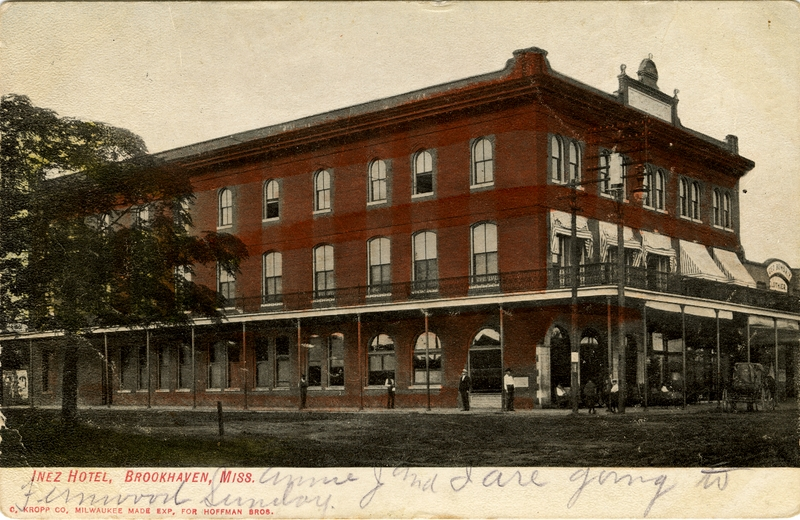

- Location within Mississippi
- Location: 104 East Monticello Street, Brookhaven, Mississippi
- Coordinates: 31°34′45″N 90°26′30″W
- Area: less than one acre
- Built: 1904
- Built by: T. Hallas & Co.
- Architect: Diboll & Owen
- Architectural style: Romanesque
- NRHP reference No.: 88002038
- Added to NRHP: October 21, 1988

The Inez Hotel, also known as The Inez Apartments, is a historic three-story building in Brookhaven, Mississippi. It was designed in the Romanesque Revival style by Diboll & Owen, and built by T. Hallas & Co. in 1904. The original owner was R. T. Scherck, who started his career by working for his father, an immigrant from Germany, at A. Scherck & Son. Scherck lived at the R.T. Scherck House. He named the hotel for his daughter, Inez Lenore Pass Scherck. The building was acquired by David Gilly in the early 1910s, followed by D.A. Biglane in 1945. Biglane sold it to Clarke College and Mississippi College. In the late 1980s, it was remodelled into a retirement facility by its new owners, Dub Sproles and Paul Jackson. It was acquired by new owners in 2003.

The building has been listed on the National Register of Historic Places since October 21, 1988. It was included in Brookhaven's annual Tour of Homes alongside other historic buildings in 2004.
