= R.T. Scherck House =

- R. T. Scherck House
- U.S. National Register of Historic Places
- Location within Mississippi
- Location: 417 South Whitworth Avenue, Brookhaven, Mississippi
- Coordinates: 31°34′29″N 90°26′38″W
- Area: 1 acre (0.40 ha)
- Built: 1896
- Architect: Chris Larson
- Architectural style: Queen Anne
- NRHP reference No.: 92000353
- Added to NRHP: April 14, 1992

The R.T. Scherck House is a historic house in Brookhaven, Mississippi. It was designed in the Queen Anne style, and built in 1896 for Richard Theodore Scherck. The latter was the son of Abraham Scherck, an immigrant from Germany. He began his career by working for his father, and he later opened the Inez Hotel in Brookhaven. The house has been listed on the National Register of Historic Places since April 14, 1992.
