= Cameron Achord =

American football coach (born 1987)

Green Bay Packers
- Title: Special teams coordinator

Personal information
- Born: February 4, 1987 (age 39); Brookhaven, Mississippi, U.S.

Career information
- High school: Brookhaven Academy
- College: Belhaven

Career history
- Southern Miss (2010–2011) Special teams graduate assistant; Southern Miss (2012) Offensive graduate assistant; Southwest Mississippi CC (2013–2016) Special teams coordinator, quarterbacks coach, running backs coach & tight ends coach; Southwest Mississippi CC (2017) Offensive coordinator, special teams coordinator, quarterbacks coach, running backs coach & tight ends coach; New England Patriots (2018–2019) Assistant special teams coach; New England Patriots (2020–2023) Special teams coordinator; New York Giants (2024–2025) Assistant special teams coach; Green Bay Packers (2026–present) Special teams coordinator

Awards and highlights
- Super Bowl champion (LIII)

Cameron Achord (born February 4, 1987) is an American football coach who is the special teams coordinator for the Green Bay Packers of the National Football League (NFL). He previously served as an assistant special teams coach for the New England Patriots and New York Giants. Achord also previously coached at the University of Southern Mississippi and Southwest Mississippi Community College.

== Coaching career ==
=== College ===
From 2010 to 2011, Achord had served as a graduate assistant for the University of Southern Mississippi Golden Eagles under head coach Larry Fedora. Following that, he joined the Southwest Mississippi Community College Bears staff for five years, holding various roles including offensive coordinator, special teams coordinator, quarterbacks coach, running backs coach, and tight ends coach during his tenure.

=== New England Patriots ===
In 2018, Achord was hired by the New England Patriots as their assistant special teams coach. In 2020, Achord was promoted to special teams coordinator following the departure of Joe Judge, who left to become the head coach of the New York Giants. He won his first Super Bowl title when the Patriots defeated the Los Angeles Rams in Super Bowl LIII.

=== New York Giants ===
On March 1, 2024, Achord was hired by the New York Giants to serve as an assistant special teams coach. On January 20th when new head coach John Harbaugh was hired he was not retained.

=== Green Bay Packers ===
On February 27, 2026, Achord was hired to serve as the special teams coordinator for the Green Bay Packers, under head coach Matt LaFleur.

== Personal life ==
Achord is a graduate of Brookhaven Academy. He graduated from Belhaven University with degrees in computer information science and sports administration in 2009. He received a master's degree in sports management from the University of Southern Mississippi in 2011.
