= Lulah Ragsdale =

American poet, novelist, actor

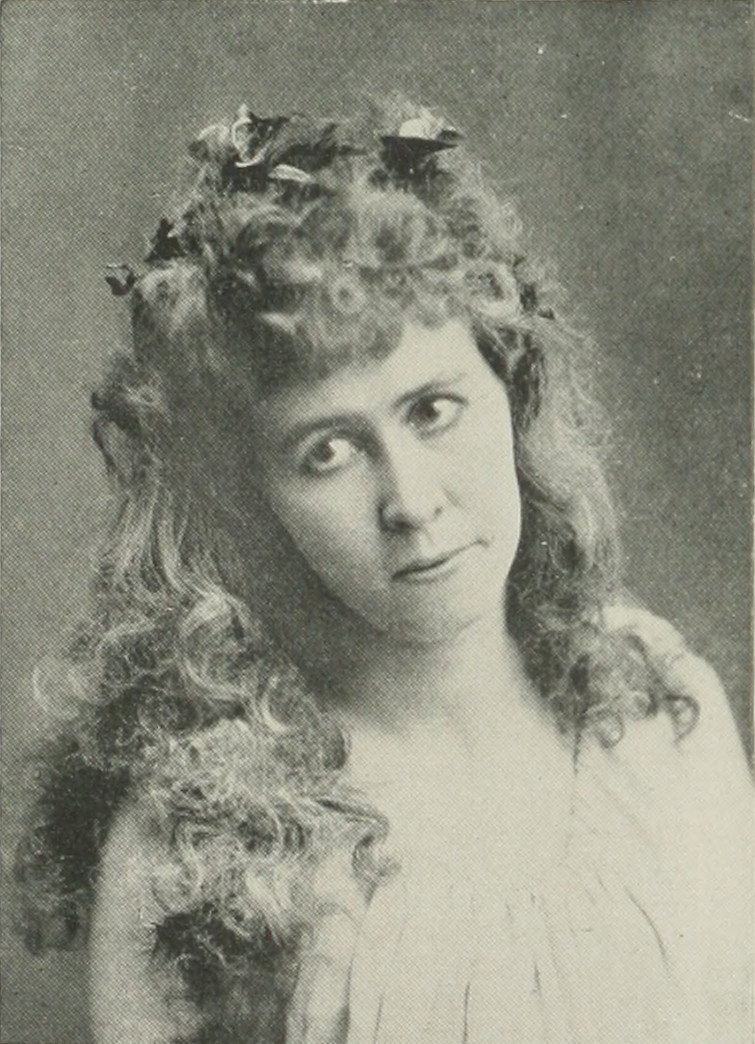
- "A Woman of the Century"
- Born: Tallulah James Ragsdale; February 5, 1861; Lawrence County, Mississippi, U.S.
- Died: December 26, 1953 (aged 92); Philadelphia, Pennsylvania, U.S.
- Resting place: Rose Hill Cemetery, Brookhaven, Mississippi
- Education: Whitworth Female College
- Occupations: poet; novelist; actor

Lulah Ragsdale (February 5, 1861 – December 26, 1953) was an American poet, novelist, and actress from the U.S. state of Mississippi. She was one of the state's first women writers. Her novels included The Crime of Philip Guthrie, 1892; A Shadow's Shadow, 1893; Miss Dulcie from Dixie, 1917; Next-Besters, 1920. Her short stories appeared in periodicals such as The Lotus, The Smart Set, The Delineator, Young's Magazine, and Today's Housewife , while Ragsdale's poetry appeared in The Times-Democrat, The Chap-Book , Harper's, Magazine of Poetry, The Boston Arena, and Munsey's Magazine. Along with poetry, she also studied drama, and was a successful actress. Ragasdale also wrote a few plays and screenwrites were picked up for some of her novels, including the 1919 American silent drama film, Miss Dulcie from Dixie. However, it was Ragsdale's novels, written in the 1890s through the 1920s, which earned her a reputation as a writer.

== Early life and education ==
Tallulah James Ragsdale was born February 5, 1862, at Cedar Hall, the stately plantation home of her mother's family -the Hookers- then in Lawrence County, Mississippi, later absorbed into the newer county of Lincoln. She was the only child of the Confederate officer, James Lafayette Ragsdale, who died in battle during the American Civil War. James was descended from several generations of the family name in the U.S., prominent in Colonial Virginia. The ancestry was originally Scotch-English. His immediate line moved to South Carolina, his father later settling in Georgia. While a very young man, James Ragsdale chose Brookhaven, Mississippi, for permanent residence, when the Illinois Central Railroad laid its tracks through that town.

In Brookhaven, he married Martha Louise Hooker, one of the Hooker girls as they were known throughout the South; their family was luminant in Mississippi history and were from England, direct descendants of Captain William Hooker, who died of yellow fever at Pascagoula. Charles E. Hooker, known as Mississippi's "silver-tongued orator," was a member of this family. The maternal grandmother of Lulah Ragsdale was Anne Ray to whom the Native American statesman, Greenwood Le Flore, for whom Leflore County, Mississippi and the city of Greenwood, Mississippi, are both named, once proposed marriage, and at whose estate "Malmaison," her grandparents were afterwards often entertained. One of Martha's ancestors was Nathaniel Hooker, a pilgrim father, whose immediate descendants settled in Virginia. She grew up in the Capt. Jack C. Hardy House in Brookhaven, Mississippi.

Lulah's early education was conducted by her mother. At an early age, Ragsdale became an avid reader.

Discerning Lulah's trend of tastes, the mother exacted the memorizing of long poems which fed into Lulah's poetic and dramatic talents. At a sufficiently mature age, Lulah was placed in Whitworth Female College in Brookhaven. Without interruption, Lulah continued her course of study until her graduation, age 16, always taking first rank in "expression" and composition and always just "getting-by" on mathematics. The young student read voraciously such books as her mother permitted her to have: Scott's novels, Dickens, George Eliot, with an occasional dip into St. Elmo for lighter reading; added to these were Shakespeare and other standard poets.

Her college days had been punctuated by acrostics to her schoolmates. Several of her essays having been written in verse, her English instructor, Professor R. S. Rickets, afterwards affiliated with Millsaps College, Jackson, Mississippi, urged her to take her poetry seriously and to express herself by rule of dactyl and spondee.

For a few years after graduation, Ragsdale led the visiting, dancing, happy-go-lucky life of the young "Main Street" girl, though she held a latent desire under her other interests to go upon the stage. She was also inspired to write verse at this period, though she made no effort to force into print.

== Career ==
Between sixteen and seventeen, Ragsdale wrote her first novel and, being ignorant of the manner of forwarding manuscripts to publishers, Ragsdale took the exact measurements of that manuscript, called on a carpenter, and had him fashion a small wooden box in which to deposit it. The carpenter nailed on the top securely. The author never received a response regarding the novel which was sent in answer to some spurious advertisement for manuscripts.

About this time, Ragsdale visited New York City with relatives and while there made occasion to study dramatic art with Miss Fannie Hunt, an English actress-teacher, who encouraged the young woman to go upon the stage. While considering this plan, she sent her first mature poem to The Times-Democrat which boasted the best purely literary page in Southern newspapers. The offerings on this page were required to be of a high standard and no money could buy space. Ragsdale received a notice of the poem's acceptance with delight and her literary ambition was revived, though the dramatic was never relinquished. Ragsdale proceeded to New York and plunged into writing, always keeping an eye on the stage as a future intention. All this time, poems were appearing over her name in The Times-Democrat and her fame was gradually widening.

About 1890, her first published poem, "My Love", appeared in the New Orleans Times-Democrat (now The Times-Picayune). It at once created a furor in the South, and was copied widely.

Then came events which called her back to Mississippi and made it imperative that she become a regular wage-earner rather than a dilettante. She put her experience and training in dramatic art into practical use by accepting a position in Whitworth Female College. Teaching was boring, but she was determined to excel at it. Her teaching activities were numerous — as a member of the faculties of Whitworth, of Belhaven, in Jackson, Mississippi, and in the conduct of a studio in Memphis, Tennessee. She also gave recitals several seasons through Southern states, presenting many of her own sketches.

In 1892, the novel The Crime of Philip Guthrie appeared with her name. It was a psycho-physical novel, particularly interesting to the student of theosophy and astral theories. In 1895, her poem, "There", was accepted by Harper's Magazine; it contained lines full of the eloquence that characterized her lyrics. "Haunted" appeared in The Chap-Book, "If I Could Know" was printed in The Boston Arena, "Faith" in Munsey's Magazine, and other poems followed rapidly, bringing fresh honors to Ragsdale. In 1897, The Lotus used several of Ragsdale's short stories, of which "The Hand of Angèle" attracted most attention. This is the experience of a Louisiana girl who contracts leprosy; this dramatic tale with inevitably tragic ending is one of the somberest of her many narratives. The New Orleans Carnival is vividly described. In 1917 appeared in The Magazine of Poetry, Boston, when Ragsdale was serving on the State Committee on Illiteracy, the vital poem, "The Illiterate", containing elements of pathos; this poem was widely copied. Her "Galatea", "Upton Rey", and many other poems were stereotyped and reproduced throughout the U.S. Ragsdale's poems appeared in the leading southern papers, but she also wrote for many northern magazines, as well as weekly and daily papers.

In 1899, Mrs. Nelson Wheatcroft's School of Acting produced at the Empire Theatre, New York, a one-act play entitled Mother which instantly brought to the author the additional honors of playwright. In 1903, J. B. Lippincott published a novel, A Shadow's Shadow, which is an adventure of an actress and her lover. The Lippincotts provided the letter-press; a paper cover in pink heightened the tone of the story. Copies of this novel became rare, owing to the fire in the Lippincott establishment. The author had no copy of this tale which had been likened to the best output of Amélie Rives.

During these years of keen activities as writer, teacher, and reciter, Ragsdale found time for club work, and she acknowledged that some of her happiest inspirations came from her Brookhaven woman's club, The Peripatetics. Through club affiliations she won, during the years of 1914, 1916, 1917, two first prizes for short stories. In 1917, the results of the literary contest of the Mississippi Federation of Women's Clubs brought her first honor through "The Mother's Son" (poem); and second honor through "Will o' Wisps". In the same contest, she was given first honor for her short story, "The Lilac Peignoir". Ragsdale always presented her poems and stories anonymously and never failed to receive honors in any contest she entered, being judged by professors of English at the University of Virginia, Tulane University, and University of Mississippi.

In 1909, "The Mother's Son" was accepted by Harper's Weekly, and in 1910, Young's Magazine published her short stories, "The Whistlepunk", "Spangles", "The Little Ghost", and others. In 1917, Ragsdale's short story, "A Woman's Glory", came out in Today's Housewife, but it was not until the appearance of her novel, Miss Dulcie from Dixie, brought out in 1917 by D. Appleton & Company, that Ragsdale felt that her years of hard and interrupted writing were showing substantial fruition. She was giving time to club and civic activities, while her freshest energies went to the enlightenment of young women in the routine of teaching.

Miss Dulcie is an unconventional, lovable, unaffected girl whom neither beauty nor homage can spoil. The tale is witty and pathetic, with a deeply intellectual undertone. The vividness of Ragsdale's portrayal of Southern life showed her familiarity with the best in it; and her metropolitan scenes are full of thrills and adventure. This novel was termed a perfect idyl and had the distinction of being one of the first books to bring back the popularity of the South as a setting for romance. Naturally, so actable a story drew the attention of picture-producers and the screen rights to Miss Dulcie of Dixie were sold to the Vitagraph Company in 1918, and produced by them with Gladys Leslie in the title-role under the direction of Joseph Gleason. The Motion Picture News of March 22, 1918 referred to this release as "attracting widespread attention, not merely on the score of its dramatic interest, but because of its wonderfully realistic depiction of Southern manners and atmosphere."

In 1920, Ragsdale's novel, The Next-Besters, was issued by Charles Scribner's Sons and in the same year, the screen rights were purchased by Famous Players–Lasky. The Next-Besters was listed as a best-seller for several months in New York reviews, and in many Southern cities. It has unobtrusive philosophies and great humor, and its situations are always unexpected.

In 1921, Ragsdale suffered a nervous breakdown. But in the same year, with newly-restored health, her old ambition was revived while recuperating in her old home in Brookhaven. Of it Ragsdale said: "I think this place I 'grew up in' has had much influence on my work. Also, I am sure teaching the young girls in college has influenced me much in my portrayal of my girls in 'Dulcie' and 'Pat' and 'Polly.' So the hateful teaching did me good, after all. It certainly made me understand girls and love them." In all these years of literary productions, however, her desire for the stage burned on, and the conviction that this was, before all, her real vocation, remained with her.

== Personal life ==
She lived at "Hardy House" in Brookhaven, which is on the National Register of Historic Places listings in Lincoln County, Mississippi. Lulah Ragsdale died December 26, 1953, in Brookhaven, Mississippi.

== Selected works ==
=== Novels ===
- The Crime of Philip Guthrie, 1892. Morrill, Higgins & Co.
- A Shadow's Shadow, 1893. J. B. Lippincott & Co.
- Miss Dulcie from Dixie, 1917. D. Appleton & Co.
- Next-Besters, 1920. Charles Scribner's Sons.

=== Short stories ===
- "The Hand of Angele", 1897. The Lotus.
- "The Dream Woman", 1897. The Lotus.
- "Batty-Cakes", 1908. The Smart Set.
- "God or Man", 1908. The Smart Set.
- "The Bird of Passage", 1909. The Delineator.
- "The Whistlepunk", 1910. Young's Magazine.
- "The Little Ghost", 1910. Young's Magazine.
- "Spangles", 1910. Young's Magazine.
- "A Woman's Glory", 1917. Today's Housewife.

=== Poetry ===
- Poems, 1888-1903. Times-Democrat.
- Poems, 1896. Chap-Book.
- Poems, 1895-1909. Harper's.
- Poem, 1917. Magazine of Poetry.

=== Plays ===
- Mother
