= Annie Coleman Peyton =

American educator

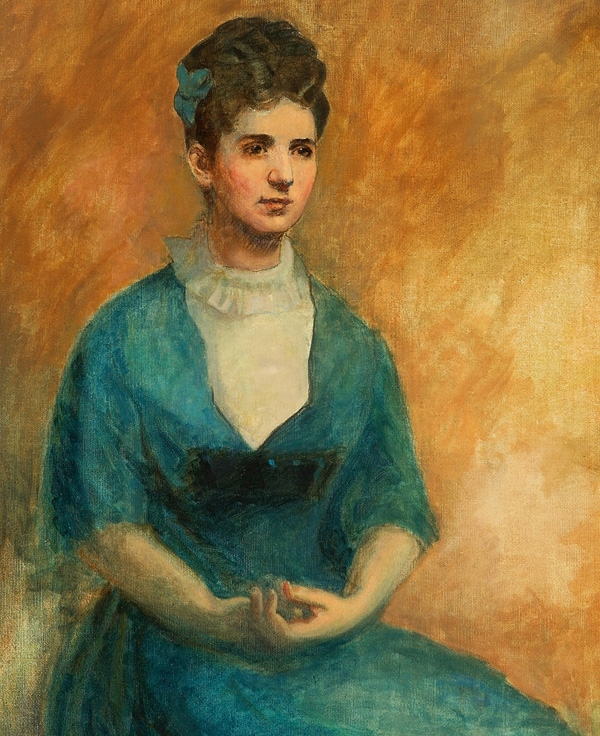
- Portrait of Annie Coleman Peyton
- Born: 1852; Madison County, Mississippi, US
- Died: November 12, 1898
- Occupation(s): cofounder Industrial Institute and College for the Education of White Girls, Educator
- Spouse(s): Ephraim G. Peyton, Jr (b. 1846 – d. 1889)

Annie Coleman Peyton (1852 – November 12, 1898) was cofounder of the Industrial Institute and College in Columbus, Mississippi in 1884 and served as an instructor at that institution from 1891 until her death in 1898.

== Early life ==
Annie Coleman was born in 1852 and was a native of Madison County, Mississippi. In 1872, she graduated from Whitworth Female College, a Methodist women's college in Brookhaven, Mississippi.

== Political activism ==
During the 1870s, while teaching at Whitworth College, Peyton became appalled by the lack of a state-funded college for women comparable to those for men in Mississippi. During that time, Sallie Eola Reneau (b. 1837 – d. 1878) from Panola County, Mississippi, had convinced the Mississippi Legislature to pass several bills toward the creation of a state-funded female college, but the bills failed due to financial constraints following the American Civil War. Frustrated by the lack of progress in establishing a state university for women, Reneau left Mississippi.

About 10 years after the unsuccessful efforts of Sallie Reneau, Annie Peyton and Olivia Valentine Hastings (b. 1843 – d. 1896), from Port Gibson, Mississippi, collaborated to actively influence the Mississippi legislature into creating a state-funded Industrial Institute and College for women.

In 1880, Annie Peyton, using the byline "A Mississippi Woman", began writing to various Mississippi newspapers, such as the Clarion Ledger, advocating for the creation of a state-supported college for women in Mississippi. Those public messages generated support from state residents and prominent Mississippi politicians, and in 1884, the state legislature passed Senate Bill 311 creating the Industrial Institute and College for the Education of White Girls. That Industrial Institute and College became the first state-supported women's college in the United States. In October 1885, the first session began at the new Industrial Institute and College on the site of the former Columbus Female Institute (1847–1877), a private college in Columbus, Mississippi. In 1891, Annie Peyton joined the faculty at the new college as a history instructor and held that position until she died in 1898.

== Personal life and legacy ==
In 1875, Annie Coleman married Ephraim G. Peyton Jr, son of Ephraim G. Peyton, Chief Justice (1870–1876) of the Mississippi Supreme Court. They made their home in Hazelhurst, Mississippi, and were the parents of seven children.

The Industrial Institute and College for the Education of White Girls, that Annie Peyton cofounded, eventually morphed into the Mississippi University for Women.

Following her death, Annie Coleman Peyton was inducted into the Mississippi Hall of Fame. Her portrait is on display in Mississippi's Old Capitol Museum in Jackson to honor her significant contributions to the state.
