= Temple B'nai Sholom =

Temple B'nai Sholom may refer to:

- B'nai Sholom Temple, in Quincy, Illinois
- Temple B'nai Sholom (Huntsville, Alabama)

== See also ==
- Temple B'nai Shalom (Brookhaven, Mississippi)
