= Foxx–Cox House =

- U.S. National Register of Historic Places
- Location within Mississippi
- Location: 402 Monticello Street, Bogue Chitto, Mississippi
- Coordinates: 31°26′20″N 90°27′19″W
- Area: less than one acre
- Built: c.1895, c.1935
- Architectural style: Queen Anne
- NRHP reference No.: 98000314
- Added to NRHP: April 1, 1998

The Foxx–Cox House is a historic one-story house in Bogue Chitto, Mississippi. It was built around 1895 in the Queen Anne style, which was popular in Mississippi from about 1895 to 1905,

Dating its construction precisely is difficult as many Lincoln County records were destroyed by fire in two burnings of the Lincoln County Courthouse. "Tradition states, however, that the original owner was an Illinois Central trainmaster named Foxx, and that the property was owned by the Coxx family at some later date, possibly around the time of the 1930s rear addition."

It was listed on the National Register of Historic Places in 1998. It was deemed significant "as an outstanding and intact local example of the Queen Anne style. The house, a one-story Queen Anne cottage, is the most ornate residence in the small rural town of Bogue Chitto."

== See also ==
- National Register of Historic Places listings in Lincoln County, Mississippi
