= Capt. Jack C. Hardy House =

- U.S. National Register of Historic Places
- Location within Mississippi
- Location: 205 Natchez Avenue, Brookhaven, Mississippi
- Coordinates: 31°34′20″N 90°26′53″W
- Area: 0 acres (0 ha)
- Built: 1877
- Architectural style: Italianate
- NRHP reference No.: 06001324
- Added to NRHP: February 1, 2007

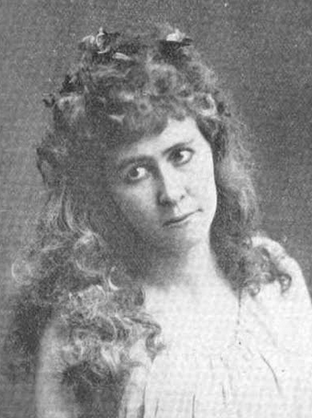
Author and actress Lulah Ragsdale, who lived in the house.

The Capt. Jack C. Hardy House is a historic house on a former stud farm in Brookhaven, Mississippi. It was designed in the Italianate architectural style, and built with red bricks by Captain J. A. Hoskins in 1877. Both Hardy and Hoskins were veterans of the American Civil War of 1861–1865. Hardy lived here with his wife, née Ellen Hooker, their six children (Will, Charles, Brooks, Monita, Ethel, and Annie), and his wife's two sisters, Bettie Hooker Brooks (including her daughter Zula) and Martha Louise Hooker Ragsdale Atkins (including her three daughters Lulah, Nell and Florence. Lulah Ragsdale became a poet, novelist, and actress. Captain Hardy bred race horses on the property; he died in 1889. The house belonged to his great-great grandson, Thomas Hardy Little, from 1995 to 2005; he was found dead in Jackson, Mississippi in 2016. Meanwhile, the house was sold multiple times. In 2017, the new homeowners began restoring it and found old poker chips that may have belonged to Captain Hardy. The house has been listed on the National Register of Historic Places since February 1, 2007.
