= Brookhaven Academy =

Location
- 943 Brookway Blvd Ext NE; Brookhaven, Mississippi 39601; United States; 31°33′23″N 90°28′58″W

Information
- Type: Independent
- Established: 1970
- Head of school: Jason Case
- Grades: K-12
- Enrollment: 575
- Colors: royal blue and white
- Nickname: Cougars
- Accreditation: Southern Association of Colleges and Schools
- Affiliation: Mississippi Association of Independent Schools
- Website: brookhavenacademy.org

Brookhaven Academy (BA) is an independent, co-educational college preparatory school in Lincoln County, Mississippi, near Brookhaven. The school was founded in 1970 as a segregation academy.

== History ==
In January 1970, the Fifth U.S. Circuit Court of Appeals ordered Mississippi to desegregate its public schools. Brookhaven Academy, Inc. was founded in 1970 as a segregation academy.

The IRS did not confer non-profit status to Brookhaven Academy Educational Foundation until 1983. In 1988, Black students walked out of nearby Brookhaven High School in protest when that school hired a coach from Brookhaven Academy, which was considered a grievous racial provocation. During the 2015-16 school year, Brookhaven Academy enrolled a single black child. In 2018, the school received attention when it was revealed that U.S. senatorial candidate Cindy Hyde-Smith sent her daughter to this school.

== Student body ==
Racial distribution in 2015-16

Race	Students
Native American	0
Asian	5
Black	1
Hispanic	3
White	386
Two or more races	0

Surrounding Lincoln County was about 30% Black.

Racial distribution in 2017-2018

Race	Students
Native American	0
Asian	6
Black	2
Hispanic	1
White	424
Two or more races	0

Surrounding Lincoln County was about 82% white, 16% Black, and 2% Hispanic.

== Sports ==
Brookhaven plays football in the MAIS 4A league.

Other boys' sports are archery, baseball, basketball, golf, soccer, and tennis. Girls' sports offered are archery, basketball, cheerleading, softball, soccer and tennis.

== Notable alumni ==
- Cameron Achord, football coach
- Corey Dickerson, baseball player

== See also ==
- List of private schools in Mississippi
- List of segregation academies in the US
- List of segregation academies in Mississippi
