= National Register of Historic Places listings in Lincoln County, Mississippi =

Location of Lincoln County in Mississippi

This is a list of the National Register of Historic Places listings in Lincoln County, Mississippi.

This is intended to be a complete list of the properties and districts on the National Register of Historic Places in Lincoln County, Mississippi, United States. Latitude and longitude coordinates are provided for many National Register properties and districts; these locations may be seen together in a map.

There are 17 properties and districts listed on the National Register in the county.

This National Park Service list is complete through NPS recent listings posted April 24, 2026.

== Current listings ==
	Name on the Register	Image	Date listed	Location	City or town	Description
1	Alexander Teen Center		November 3, 2009 (#09000885)	456 Rogers St. 31°34′15″N 90°26′04″W	Brookhaven	
2	Brookhaven City Hall	Brookhaven City Hall	June 16, 1983 (#83000957)	Whitworth Ave. 31°34′39″N 90°26′39″W	Brookhaven	
3	Brookhaven Manufacturing Corporation		July 23, 2021 (#100006775)	109 Main St. 31°35′13″N 90°26′09″W	Brookhaven	
4	Building at 306 South Jackson Street		April 17, 1980 (#80002282)	306 South Jackson Street; 31°34′38″N 90°26′44″W	Brookhaven	
5	Emile Cohn House		November 30, 2011 (#11000870)	536 S. Jackson St. 31°34′29″N 90°26′47″W	Brookhaven	
6	Downtown Brookhaven Historic District		July 15, 1999 (#99000839)	Roughly bounded by Court St., W. Chichasaw St., S. First St., and jct. of W. Cherokee and W. Monticello; 31°34′45″N 90°26′42″W	Brookhaven	
7	First Methodist Church		November 17, 1997 (#97001298)	215 W. Cherokee St. 31°34′43″N 90°26′44″W	Brookhaven	
8	Foxx-Cox House		April 1, 1998 (#98000314)	402 Monticello St. 31°26′20″N 90°27′19″W	Bogue Chitto	
9	Capt. Jack C. Hardy House		February 1, 2007 (#06001324)	205 Natchez Ave. 31°34′20″N 90°26′53″W	Brookhaven	
10	Hartman Funeral Home		January 17, 2024 (#100009745)	101 W. Chickasaw Street; 31°34′38″N 90°26′38″W	Brookhaven	
11	Inez Hotel	Inez Hotel	October 21, 1988 (#88002038)	104 E. Monticello St. 31°34′45″N 90°26′30″W	Brookhaven	
12	A.E. Moreton Jr. House		March 25, 1999 (#99000384)	610 S. Jackson St. 31°34′23″N 90°26′51″W	Brookhaven	
13	Robert D. Moreton House		October 20, 1995 (#95001188)	613 S. Jackson St. 31°34′22″N 90°26′48″W	Brookhaven	
14	Paxton House		June 27, 1997 (#97000632)	2261 Bouie Mill Rd. NW; 31°37′13″N 90°34′25″W	Brookhaven vicinity	
15	R.T. Scherck House		April 14, 1992 (#92000353)	417 S. Whitworth Ave. 31°34′29″N 90°26′38″W	Brookhaven	
16	Union Station	Union Station	August 21, 1980 (#80002283)	S. Whitworth Ave. 31°34′44″N 90°26′34″W	Brookhaven	
17	US Post Office	US Post Office	October 28, 1983 (#83003963)	201 W. Cherokee St. 31°34′42″N 90°26′42″W	Brookhaven	

== See also ==
- List of National Historic Landmarks in Mississippi
- National Register of Historic Places listings in Mississippi
