= FourTwoNine =

FourTwoNine (the numbers spell out "gay" on a cellphone keypad) is an American print publication. FourTwoNine, according to its website, is "an up-to-the-minute men’s brand aimed at thought influencers and cultural leaders of all genders." The website further states that "each issue of FourTwoNine highlights the latest news in culture, style, sports, technology, business and politics, while casting a spotlight on the leaders and innovators who are driving contemporary culture."

It was founded in 2013 by Richard Klein, founder and former publisher of Surface. It is based in Los Angeles.

== History ==
The first issue, in September 2013, focused on "Friendship" and featured Andy Cohen and Sarah Jessica Parker on its cover. It was voted "Launch of the Year" by Folio Magazine.

The March 2015 issue featured James Franco discussing his sexuality, in an "interview" between Franco's "straight half" and his "gay half".

Kevin Sessums contributed to the magazine until parting ways in July 2015.

In 2016, Maer Roshan became editor in chief, adding more robust reporting and feature writing to the magazine.
