= Lynching of Eli Pigot =

Eli Pigot was a Black man who was lynched in Brookhaven, Mississippi in 1908 by a mob of White people.

Pigot was accused of raping a woman named Miss Williams, and was arrested in Jackson, Mississippi. He was then sent to Brookhaven, Mississippi to stand trial. Pigot was accompanied by the Capitol Light Guards, who were directed by governor Noel to protect him. They arrived in Brookhaven at 7:00 AM on February 10, 1908. A crowd had gathered before daylight to meet the train, and when it arrived, a mob assaulted the military guard, kidnapped Pigot and hanged him. The guard did make some attempt to protect Pigot, shooting (with minor wounds) two of them. The mob was said to include many prominent citizens, especially those from near Ruth, Mississippi, where the alleged assault had occurred. Judge Wilkinson, who was scheduled to try Pigot, along with several White members of the jury allegedly participated in the murder. After the lynching, most press reports focused on praise for the military guard of 58 men who failed to protect him. The mob made no attempt to hide their identities, not even wearing masks. Despite the completely public nature of the lynching, with an estimated 2,000 witnesses, and the presence of many of the officers of the court, no one was ever held accountable for the murder of Mr. Pigot.

Pigot's relatives did not claim his body and it was buried in the potter's field on the county farm.
