= Whitworth Female College =

Methodist women's college in Brookhaven, Mississippi

Whitworth Female College, Brookhaven, Mississippi

Whitworth Female College was a Methodist women's college in Brookhaven, Mississippi, founded in 1858 by Milton Whitworth. It is a Mississippi Landmark.

== History ==
The women's college was founded in 1858 by Milton J. Whitworth, opened in 1859, and disestablished in 1984. It was associated with the Mississippi Methodist Conference until 1938.

During the Civil War the college was used as a Confederate hospital and managed to reopen after the war's end.

Advertisement for the college from the New Orleans Daily Picayune, July 24, 1878

In August 1878, local freemasons laid the cornerstone for a new brick building at the college, into which a time capsule was placed. Both U.S. Senator from Mississippi Lucius Quintus Cincinnatus Lamar II and Jefferson Davis were expected to attend the ceremony but were "unavoidably absent."

In 1925 the College was first accredited by the Southern Association of Colleges and Schools. In 1928 the College began operation as a two-year institution associated with Millsaps College in Jackson, Mississippi. In 1938, because of financial difficulties, the board of trustees of the College voted to cease operations and merge the school with Millsaps College. The city of Brookhaven bought the campus and leased it out to various short-lived colleges between 1941 and 1984, when all educational operations at the location ceased.

In 2003 the state of Mississippi opened the Mississippi School of the Arts on the grounds of the former college.

== Vardaman's visit ==
Whitworth College students in costume with horses on April 24, 1913

During his term as Governor of Mississippi (1904-1908), white supremacist politician James Kimble Vardaman, known as the "Great White Chief," spoke at the college and was presented with a bouquet and the following poem:

TO THE "WHITE CHIEFTAIN."
White flowers to our chieftain white,
Brookhaven's daughters send;
To welcome him with glad delight
The Southland's truest friend.
Be not afraid! Thou white man's chief,
The Anglo-Saxon Race
Has yet to bend its neck beneath
A victor's cruel mace.
The blood is yours on land and sea
Uphold thro' its supremacy.

== Notable alumnae ==
- Annie Coleman Peyton (1852-1898), co-founder of first state supported college for women in the US – Industrial Institute and College (now Mississippi University for Women) in Columbus, Mississippi
- Alice Cary McKinney (1865-1928), temperance and social reformer
- Lulah Ragsdale (1862-1953), poet, novelist and actor
- Nellie Nugent Somerville (1863–1952), first woman elected to the Mississippi Legislature
