= Kevin Sessums =

American author, editor and actor (born 1956)

- Born: March 28, 1956 (age 70); Forest, Mississippi, U.S.
- Education: Millsaps College
- Occupations: Author, magazine editor
- Known for: Mississippi Sissy; I Left It On the Mountain

Kevin Howard Scott Sessums (born March 28, 1956) is an American author, editor and actor.

== Early life ==
Kevin Sessums was born on March 28, 1956, in Forest, Mississippi. His brother is artist J. Kim Sessums of Brookhaven, Mississippi.

Sessums attended, but dropped out of, the Juilliard School in New York City.

== Career ==
Sessums served as executive editor of Interview and as a contributing editor of Vanity Fair, Allure, and Parade. He was an Editor at Large at Grazia USA. Other work has appeared in Travel+Leisure, Elle, Out, Marie Claire, Playboy, Thedailybeast.com and Towleroad.com. He was the founding editor-in-chief of FourTwoNine magazine, as well as the Editor at Large of the Curran Theatre in San Francisco. In 2022, he sold or donated almost all his possessions and set out with a couple of suitcases to be a cultural and spiritual pilgrim in the world. He lives half of each year in a small room in London and the other in small rooms around the globe. He writes the online newsletter SES/SUMS IT UP.

In 2007, Sessums published a memoir titled Mississippi Sissy, a narrative of his conflicted life as a self-aware gay boy growing up in Forest, Mississippi. It made the New York Times Bestseller list and won the 2008 Lambda Literary Award for Best Male Memoir. His audio recording of Mississippi Sissy was nominated for a 2007 Quill Award. In 2015, he published his second memoir, I Left It on the Mountain, which made the New York Times Celebrity Bestseller List.

Sessums portrayed Peter Cipriani in the miniseries adaptation of Armistead Maupin's Tales of the City.

Sessums was banned from posting on Facebook for 24 hours on December 29, 2016, after he compared the supporters of President-elect Donald Trump to a "nasty fascistic lot" in a post. The company subsequently issued an apology.

== Personal life ==
Sessums is openly gay and HIV positive. In an August 2014 interview with The New York Times to promote FourTwoNine, a magazine, he, now in recovery for over a decade, claimed to have used crystal meth. At the time of the interview, he resided in San Francisco.

== Works ==
- Sessums, Kevin (2007). Mississippi Sissy. New York: St. Martin's Press. ISBN 9780312341015. OCLC 71812897.
- Sessums, Kevin (2015). I left it on the mountain. New York: St. Martin's Press. ISBN 9780312598389. OCLC 892514325.
