= Corey Dickerson =

American baseball player (born 1989)

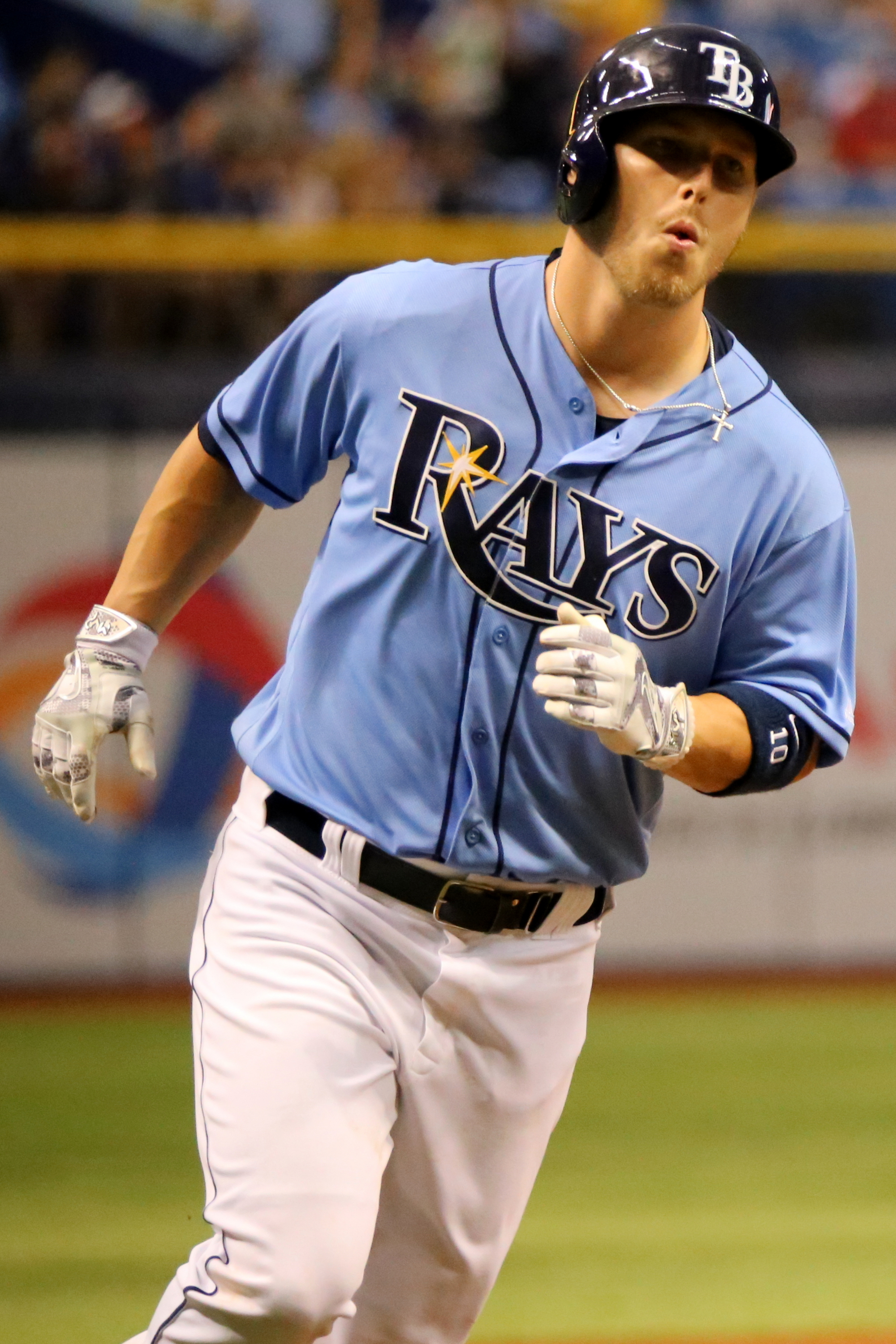
- Dickerson with the Tampa Bay Rays in 2016

Tampa Bay Rays – No. 10
- Left fielder / Coach
- Born: May 22, 1989 (age 37); McComb, Mississippi, U.S.
- Batted: Left Threw: Right

MLB debut
- June 22, 2013, for the Colorado Rockies

Last MLB appearance
- August 2, 2023, for the Washington Nationals

MLB statistics
- Batting average: .280
- Home runs: 136
- Runs batted in: 469
- Stats at Baseball Reference

Teams
- As player: Colorado Rockies (2013–2015); Tampa Bay Rays (2016–2017); Pittsburgh Pirates (2018–2019); Philadelphia Phillies (2019); Miami Marlins (2020–2021); Toronto Blue Jays (2021); St. Louis Cardinals (2022); Washington Nationals (2023); As coach: Tampa Bay Rays (2026–present)

Career highlights and awards
- All-Star (2017); Gold Glove Award (2018)

McKenzie Corey Dickerson (born May 22, 1989) is an American professional baseball coach and former left fielder who currently serves as the first base coach for the Tampa Bay Rays of Major League Baseball (MLB). He played in MLB for the Colorado Rockies (2013–2015), Rays (2016–2017), Pittsburgh Pirates (2018–2019), Philadelphia Phillies (2019), Miami Marlins (2020–2021), Toronto Blue Jays (2021), St. Louis Cardinals (2022), and Washington Nationals (2023).

The Rockies selected Dickerson in the eighth round of the 2010 Major League Baseball draft, and he made his MLB debut in 2013. Dickerson was an MLB All-Star in 2017 and won a Gold Glove Award in 2018. The Nationals released him in August 2023, and he officially retired in 2024, becoming the coach at Jackson Academy earlier that year.

== Amateur career ==
Dickerson was born in McComb, Mississippi and raised in Brookhaven, Mississippi. He attended Brookhaven Academy in Brookhaven, where he played baseball and also starred in football and basketball. In his junior year, he injured his shoulder at a baseball camp, forcing him to move from shortstop to the outfield in baseball, and from quarterback to wide receiver in football. Dickerson holds the State Private School Association career and single-season records for home runs, with 45 over four seasons, and 15 his senior year. Also, his single-season .591 batting average and 55 runs batted in (RBIs) are both Brookhaven Academy records.

Dickerson then enrolled at Meridian Community College in Meridian, Mississippi on a full baseball scholarship, where he played center field and was the leadoff hitter for the school's baseball team. During his freshman season at Meridian, Dickerson hit .459 with 21 home runs.

== Professional career ==
=== Colorado Rockies ===
The Colorado Rockies drafted Dickerson out of high school in the 29th round in 2009, but he did not sign and attended community college. The Rockies then selected Dickerson in the eighth round of the 2010 Major League Baseball draft.

In 2010, he played for Casper Ghosts in the Pioneer League, and batted .348(6th in the league)/.412(8th in the league)/.632(leading the league) with 54 runs (8th), 22 doubles (2nd), 9 triples (2nd), 13 home runs (tied for 3rd), and 61 RBI (tied for the league lead) in 276 at bats. On September 6, 2010, he was a Pioneer League Player of the Week. In 2010 he was a Pioneer League postseason All Star, an MiLB Organization All Star, and a Topps Short-Season/Rookie All Star.

On June 3, 2011, while playing with the Single-A Asheville Tourists, Dickerson recorded 10 RBIs on three home runs, tied for the most RBIs in a single game in South Atlantic League history, a record that had stood for 33 years. On July 11, 2011, he was the league's Player of the Week. In 2011, he batted .282/.356/.629(3rd in the SAL) with 78 runs (5th), 5 triples (tied for 10th), 32 home runs (leading the league), and 87 RBI (tied for 3rd) for Asheville in 435 plate appearances and was an MiLB Organization All Star. He was fourth in the minor leagues in both home runs and slugging percentage in 2011.

In 2012, Dickerson played for the Tulsa Drillers of the Double-A Texas League and for the Modesto Nuts of the California League. He batted a combined .304/.358/.542 with 22 home runs and 81 RBI in 559 plate appearances. He was a California League mid-season All Star. He then played in the Arizona Fall League, where he batted .364/.368/.515 in 68 at bats and was named a Rising Star.

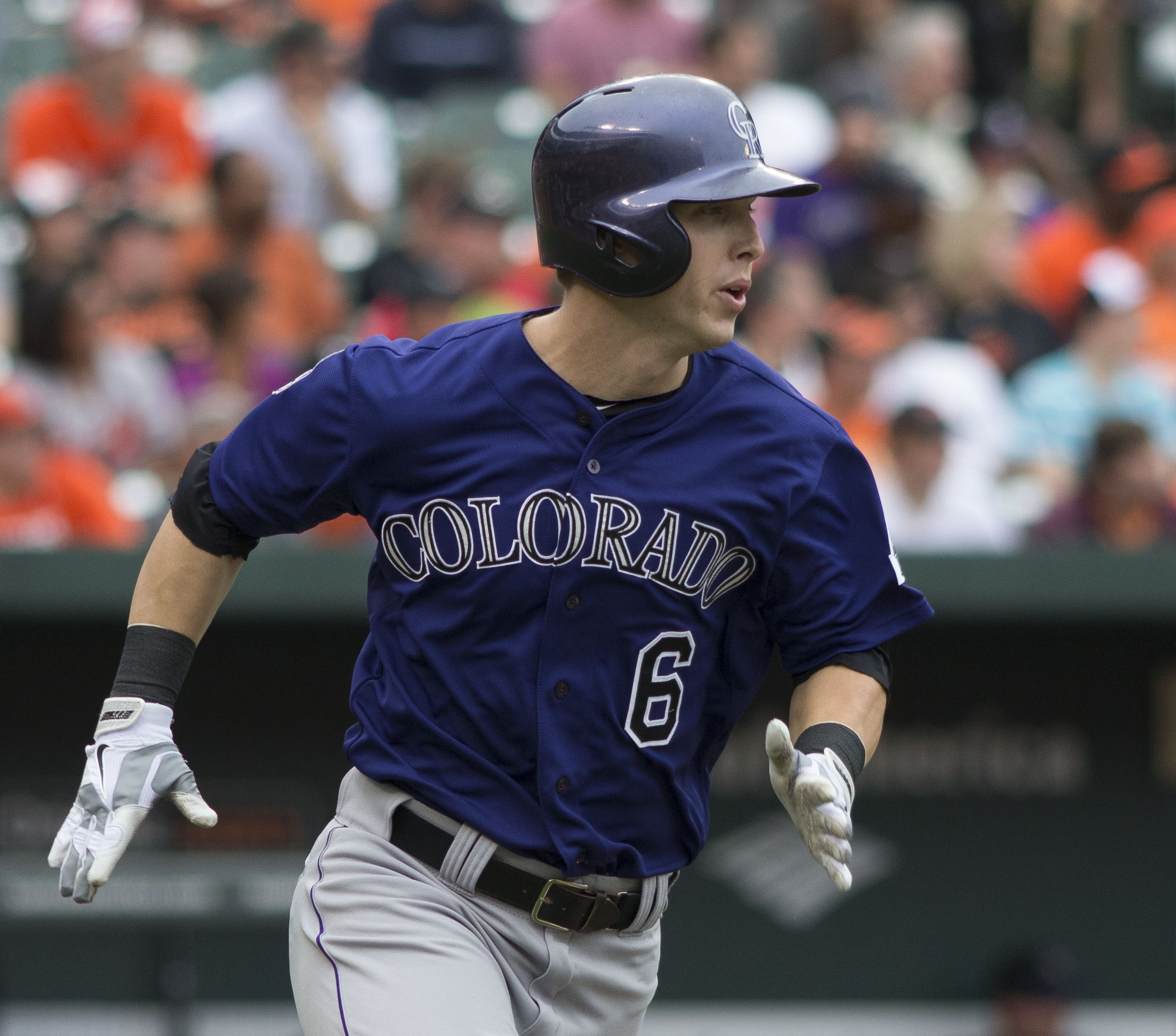
Dickerson with the Rockies in 2013

Prior to the 2013 season, MLB named him the 16th-best prospect in the Rockies system. In 2013, he batted .371(2nd in the Pacific Coast League)/.414/.632(3rd) with 14 triples (leading the league), 11 home runs, and 50 RBI in 345 plate appearances with Colorado Springs and was a PCL postseason All Star, and an MiLB Organization All Star.

The Rockies promoted Dickerson to the major leagues on June 21, 2013. He made his debut the next day at Nationals Park, where he picked up his first two career hits, both doubles, and his first career RBI as the Rockies beat the Washington Nationals. On July 28, Dickerson hit his first career home run off Milwaukee Brewers pitcher Donovan Hand, in a Rockies victory. In 2013, in the majors he batted .263/.316/.459 with 5 home runs and 17 RBI in 213 plate appearances.

Dickerson began the 2014 season with the Rockies, but was optioned back to the Triple-A Colorado Springs Sky Sox when reliever Boone Logan was activated from the disabled list. On June 18, in a game versus the Los Angeles Dodgers, Dickerson was the only batter to reach base safely during Clayton Kershaw's no-hitter, reaching on an error. In 2014 in the majors, he batted .312(9th-best in the league)/.364/.567(3rd-highest in the NL) with 24 home runs, 18.2 at bats per home run (6th-best in the NL), and 76 RBI in 478 plate appearances.

Dickerson suffered two broken ribs while diving for a catch on June 30, 2015. In 2015, he batted .304/.333/.536 with 10 home runs and 31 RBI in 234 plate appearances.

=== Tampa Bay Rays ===
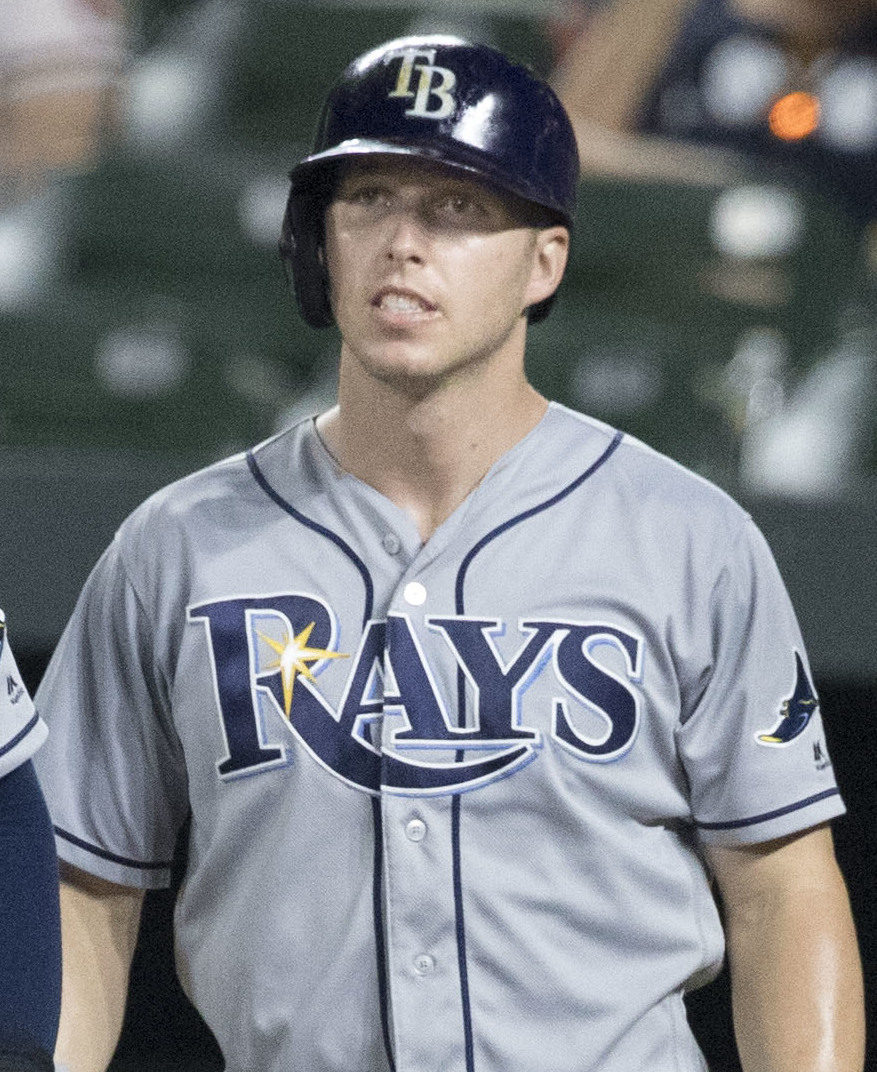
Dickerson in 2017

On January 28, 2016, Dickerson was traded with Kevin Padlo to the Tampa Bay Rays for pitchers Jake McGee and Germán Márquez. In 2016, Dickerson's first season away from Coors Field, his batting line dropped to .245/.293/.469, as he hit a career-high 36 doubles (10th in the AL) with 24 home runs and 70 RBIs in 510 at bats. He spent most of his time as the DH and left fielder.

In 2017, Dickerson's play was completely transformed, and he hit in the leadoff spot. His turnaround led him to a .325/.367/.569 line with 17 home runs at the All-Star break, leading the DH position in nearly every category. His numbers led him to beat out incumbent Nelson Cruz for the starting DH spot in the All-Star Game, becoming the first Ray to start the game since 2010 (Carl Crawford, Evan Longoria, David Price). Dickerson's performance waned in the second half. Dickerson ended 2017 batting .282/.325/.490 with a career-high 27 home runs and 62 RBIs in 588 at-bats. He swung at 45.6% of pitches outside the strike zone (the highest percentage in the majors). On defense, his two double plays were the most by an American League left fielder, and his range factor/9 IP of 2.22 was second-best among AL left fielders.

=== Pittsburgh Pirates ===
The Rays designated Dickerson for assignment on February 17, 2018. On February 22, they traded him to the Pittsburgh Pirates for Daniel Hudson, Tristan Gray, and cash. On April 26, Dickerson hit his first career walk-off home run, off of Alex Wilson. It was the only run of the game as the Pirates beat the Tigers 1–0.

In 2018, Dickerson hit .300 (8th in the NL)/.330/.474 with seven triples (9th), 13 home runs, and 55 RBIs in 504 at-bats, and swung at 59.3% of all pitches he saw, tops in the major leagues. He had the highest fielding percentage among major league left fielders, at .996, the highest range factor/9 IP among NL left fielders (2.23), and had five double plays (most among NL outfielders) and seven assists (second-most among NL left fielders). He also earned his first career Gold Glove Award.

In 2019 with the Pirates, he batted .317/.376/.556 with four home runs and 25 RBIs in 126 at-bats.

=== Philadelphia Phillies ===
On July 31, 2019, the Pirates traded Dickerson to the Philadelphia Phillies for a player to be named later and international signing bonus money. The teams would later agree to replace the player to be named later with more cash paid to the Pirates. At the time of the trade, he was owed $2.8 million of his annual $8.5 million salary for the final two months of the season.

In 2019 with the Phillies, he batted .293/.307/.579 with eight home runs and 34 RBIs in 133 at-bats. His season was cut short by a fractured navicular bone in his left foot.

=== Miami Marlins ===
On January 6, 2020, Dickerson signed a two-year, $17.5 million contract with the Miami Marlins. In 2020, he had the lowest fielding percentage of all major league left fielders, at .970. On the offensive side, Dickerson slashed .258/.311/.402 with seven home runs and 17 RBI in 194 at-bats. In 62 games with Miami in 2021, Dickerson slashed .260/.321/.377 with two home runs and 14 RBI.

=== Toronto Blue Jays ===
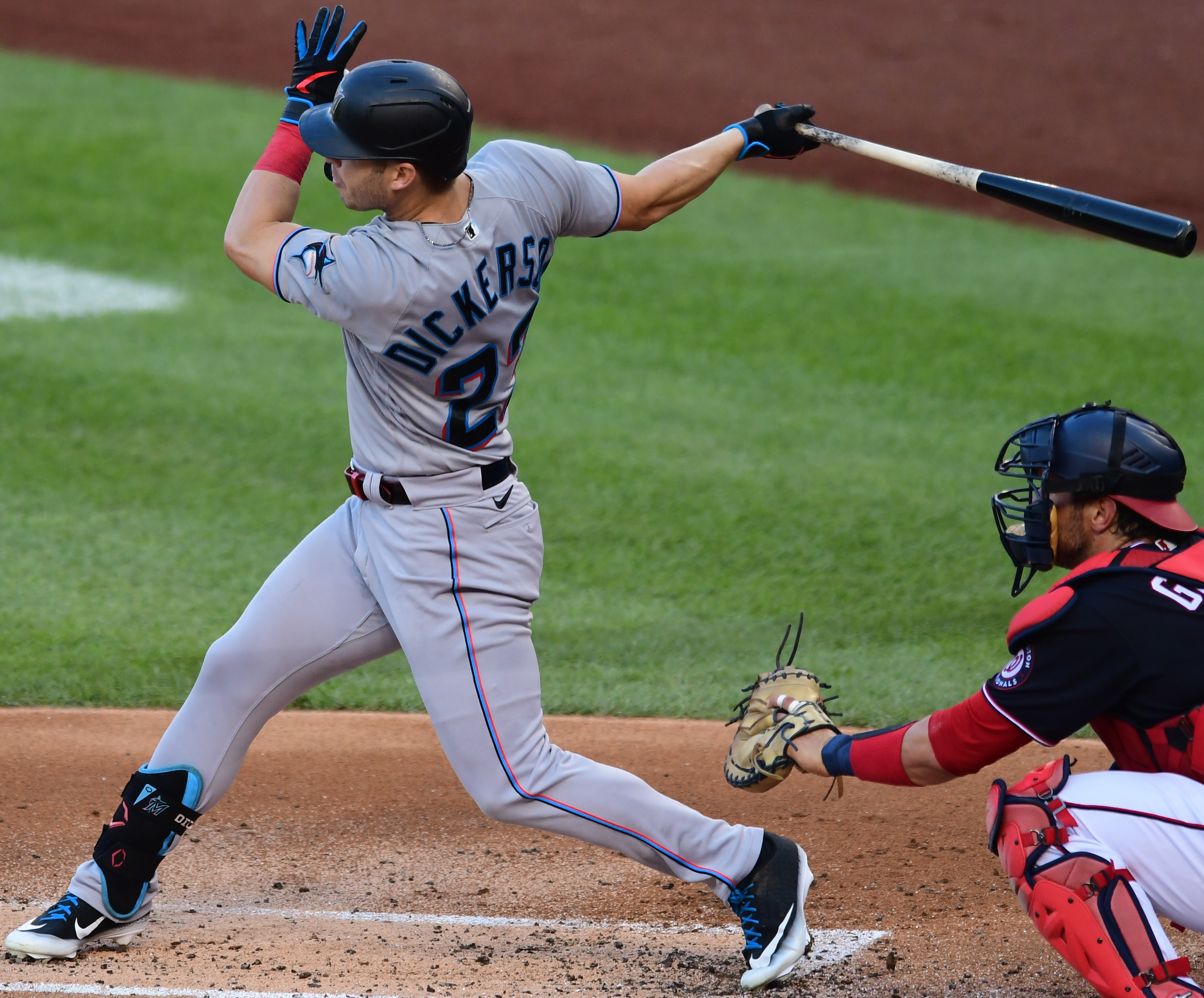
Dickerson with the Miami Marlins in 2021

On June 29, 2021, Dickerson was traded to the Toronto Blue Jays alongside Adam Cimber for Joe Panik and minor league pitcher Andrew McInvale.

=== St. Louis Cardinals ===
On March 18, 2022, Dickerson signed a one-year, $5 million deal with the St. Louis Cardinals. Over three games from August 23 to 25, Dickerson recorded 10 hits in 10 consecutive at-bats, giving him the longest such streak by a Cardinal in the expansion era.

=== Washington Nationals and retirement ===
On January 10, 2023, Dickerson signed a one-year, $2.25 million deal with the Washington Nationals. In 49 games, Dickerson hit .250/.283/.354 with 2 home runs and 17 RBI. The Nationals released him on August 2; appearing as a pinch hitter in the ninth in what would turn out to be his final major league appearance, Dickerson had reached first and eventually scored the walk-off winning run on a close play at the plate earlier that day.

Dickerson officially retired from professional baseball on December 31, 2024.

== Coaching career ==
On June 10, 2024, Dickerson was hired as the head baseball coach at Jackson Academy in Jackson, Mississippi.

On December 22, 2025, the Tampa Bay Rays hired Dickerson to serve as their first base coach.

== Personal life ==
Dickerson's wife gave birth to their first son in 2014. On February 22, 2018, the same day he was traded to the Pirates, the couple had their second son. In the offseason, Dickerson resides in Madison, Mississippi.
