= United Methodist Church of Batavia =

Historic church in Illinois, United States

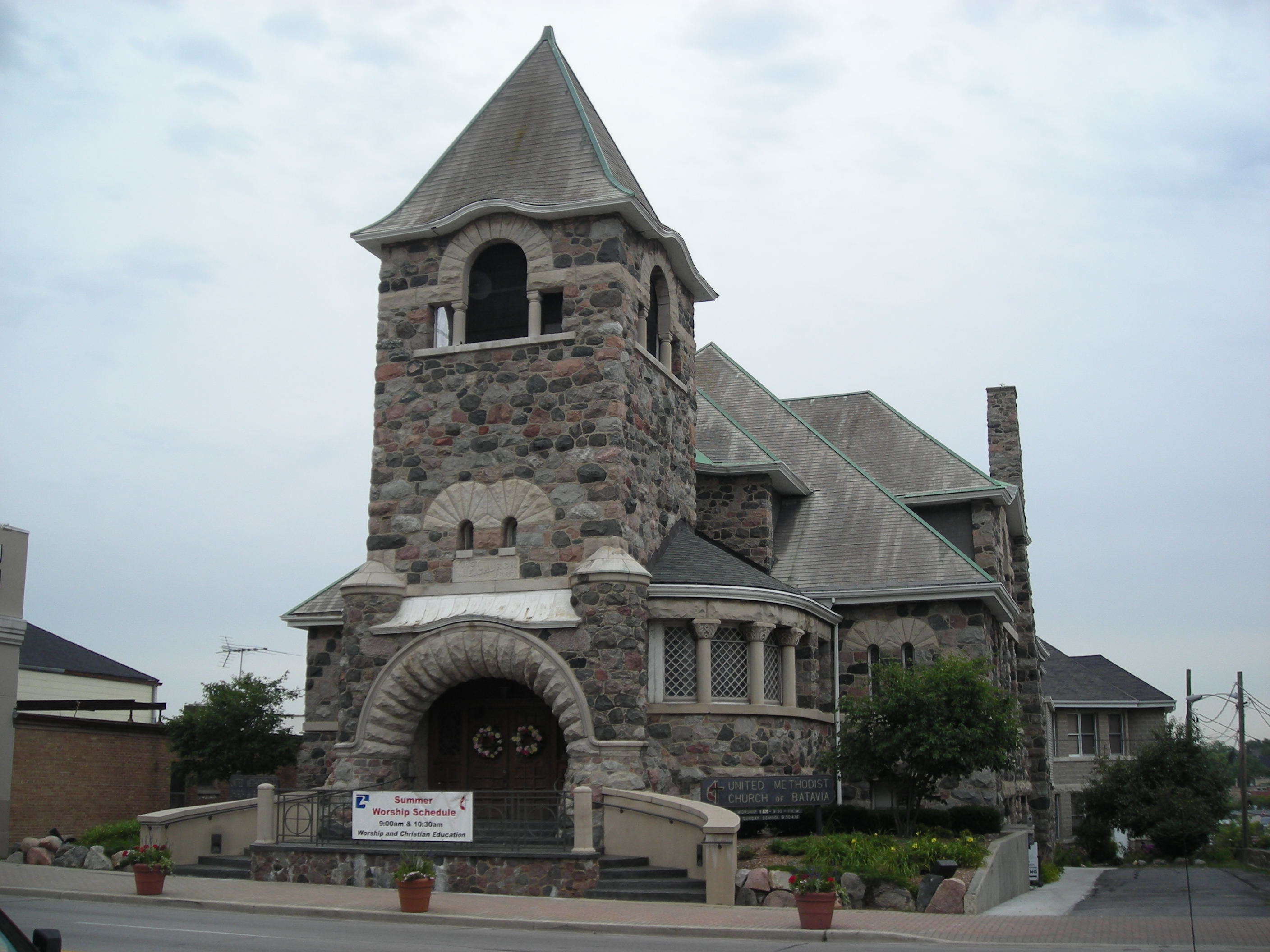

Religion
- Affiliation: Methodism
- Leadership: Pastor Melissa Meyers, Senior Pastor
- Status: Active

Location
- Location: 8 N. Batavia Ave. Batavia, Kane County, Illinois, U.S.
- Interactive map of United Methodist Church of Batavia
- Coordinates: 41.850556°N 88.311667°W

Architecture
- Architect: Solon Spencer Beman
- Style: Romanesque Revival
- Completed: 1887
- Direction of façade: West

U.S. National Register of Historic Places
- Added to NRHP: July 28, 1983
- NRHP Reference no.: 83000320

The United Methodist Church of Batavia is a historical church in Batavia, Illinois. Funds for the church were donated by Rev. E. H. Gammon and Cpt. Don Carlos Newton in 1887 to replace the First Methodist Church of Batavia. It was designed by famed local architect Solon Spencer Beman in the Romanesque Revival style. It was added to the National Register of Historic Places in 1983.

== History ==
The First Methodist Church of Batavia served the Methodist congregation in Batavia, Illinois from 1852 to 1887. The first minister of that church, Rev. E. H. Gammon, later entered the agricultural machinery business and became wealthy. He and industrialist Cpt. Don Carlos Newton donated a large sum of money to erect a new Methodist church in Batavia. Newton had recently visited southern France and was intrigued by the local French Romanesque Revival style. He recommended this style to prominent local architect Solon Spencer Beman, who was commissioned to design the building.

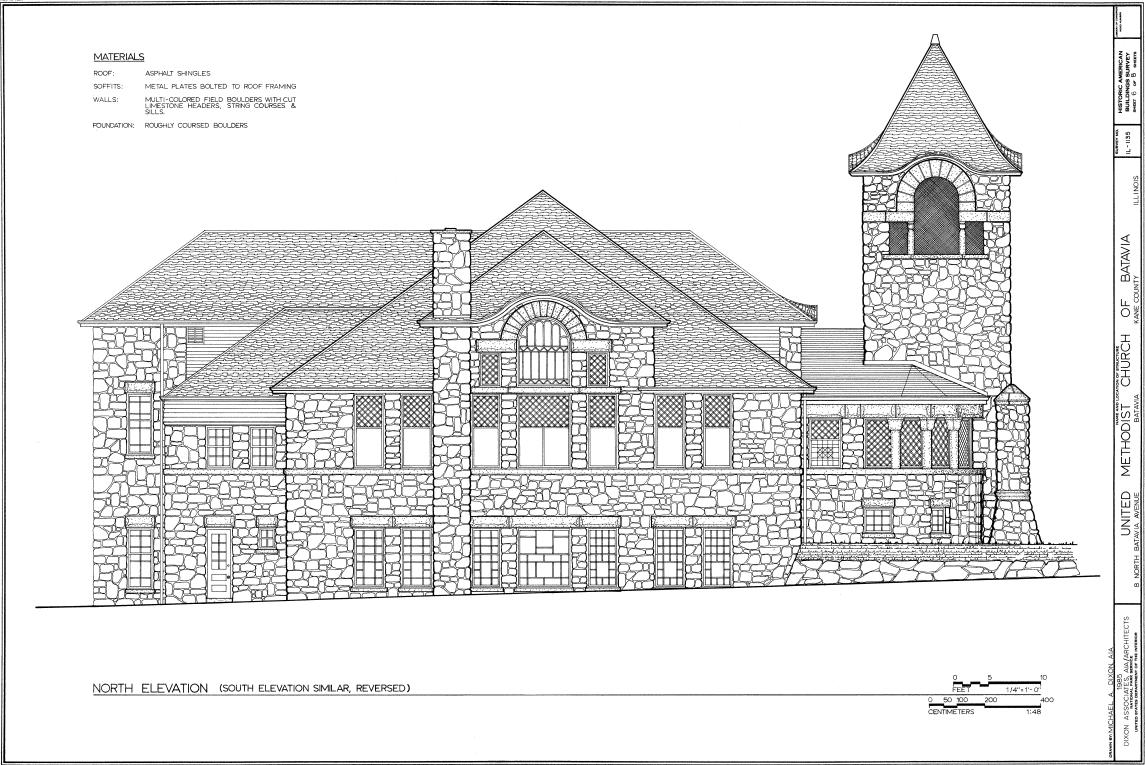
The northern exterior of the church, as prepared by the Historic American Buildings Survey.

The exterior of the building was primarily constructed with local boulders, mostly from I. S. Stephens' Mill Creek Farm—Stephens also worked as the building's contractor. Limestone details were carefully crafted to provide contrast to the more erratic pattern of the boulders. The church is 106 by 60 feet (32 by 18 m) with a square nave featuring a barrel vault ceiling. The nave has thirteen rows of red oak pews in three segments. The tower rises 52 feet (16 m) from the ground with a pyramidal roof. Palladian archways on the north and south ends of the tower flank the bells.

The church was added to the National Register of Historic Places on July 28, 1983. A three-story addition was built to the east in 1991. Services are still held in the church.
