= First Methodist Church (Waukesha, Wisconsin) =

Historic church in Wisconsin, United States

- U.S. National Register of Historic Places
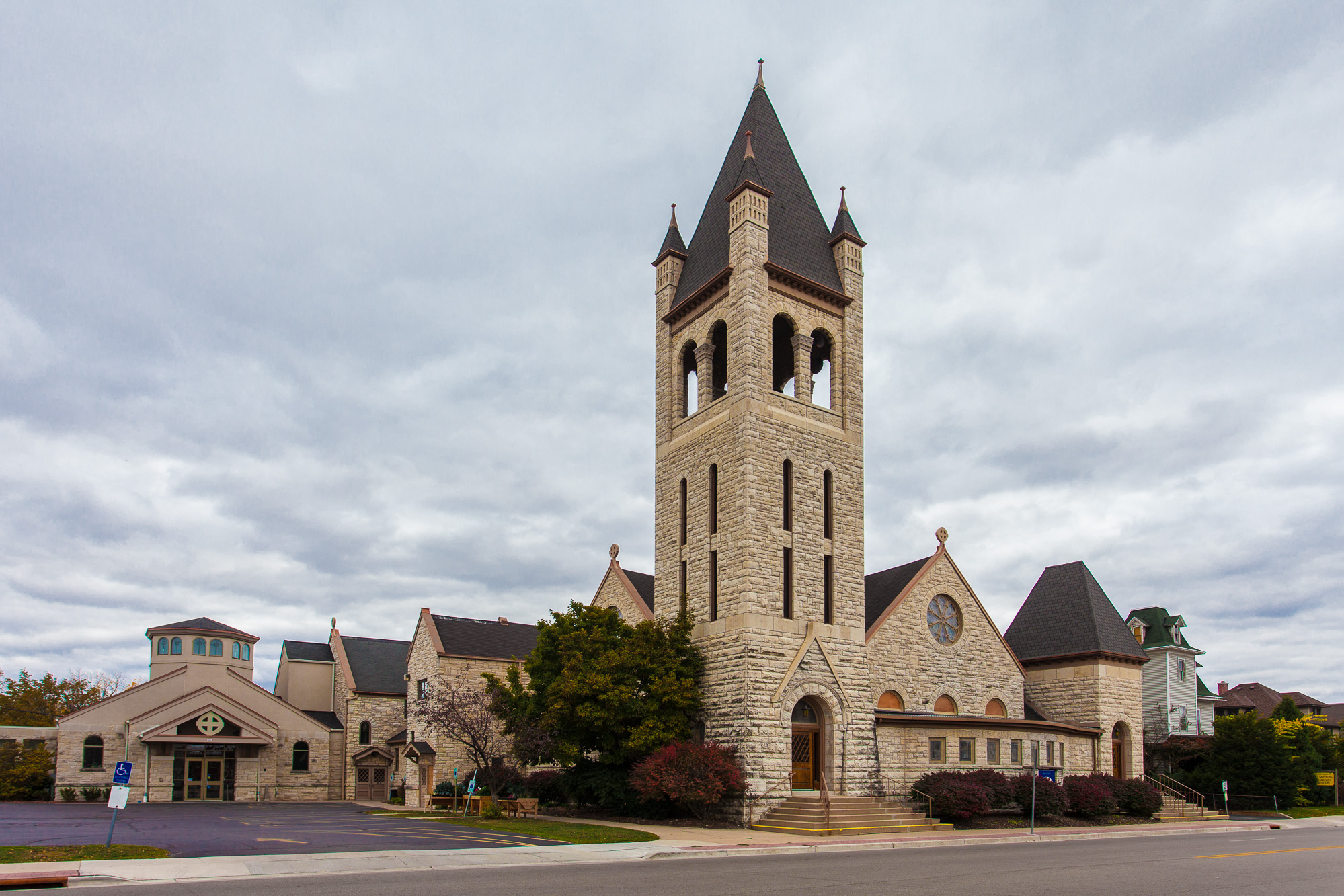

- Location within Wisconsin Location within the United States
- Location: 121 Wisconsin Ave., Waukesha, Wisconsin
- Coordinates: 43°0′34″N 88°12′56″W
- Area: less than one acre
- Built: 1898
- Architect: Henry F. Starbuck
- Architectural style: Romanesque
- MPS: Waukesha MRA
- NRHP reference No.: 83004335
- Added to NRHP: December 1, 1983

First Methodist Church is located in Waukesha, Wisconsin. It is affiliated with the United Methodist Church. The church, designed by Henry F. Starbuck, was built in the Romanesque architectural style in 1895. It was added to the National Register of Historic Places on December 1, 1983, for its architectural significance.
