= First Methodist Church of Clovis =

Historic church in New Mexico, United States

- U.S. National Register of Historic Places
- NM State Register of Cultural Properties
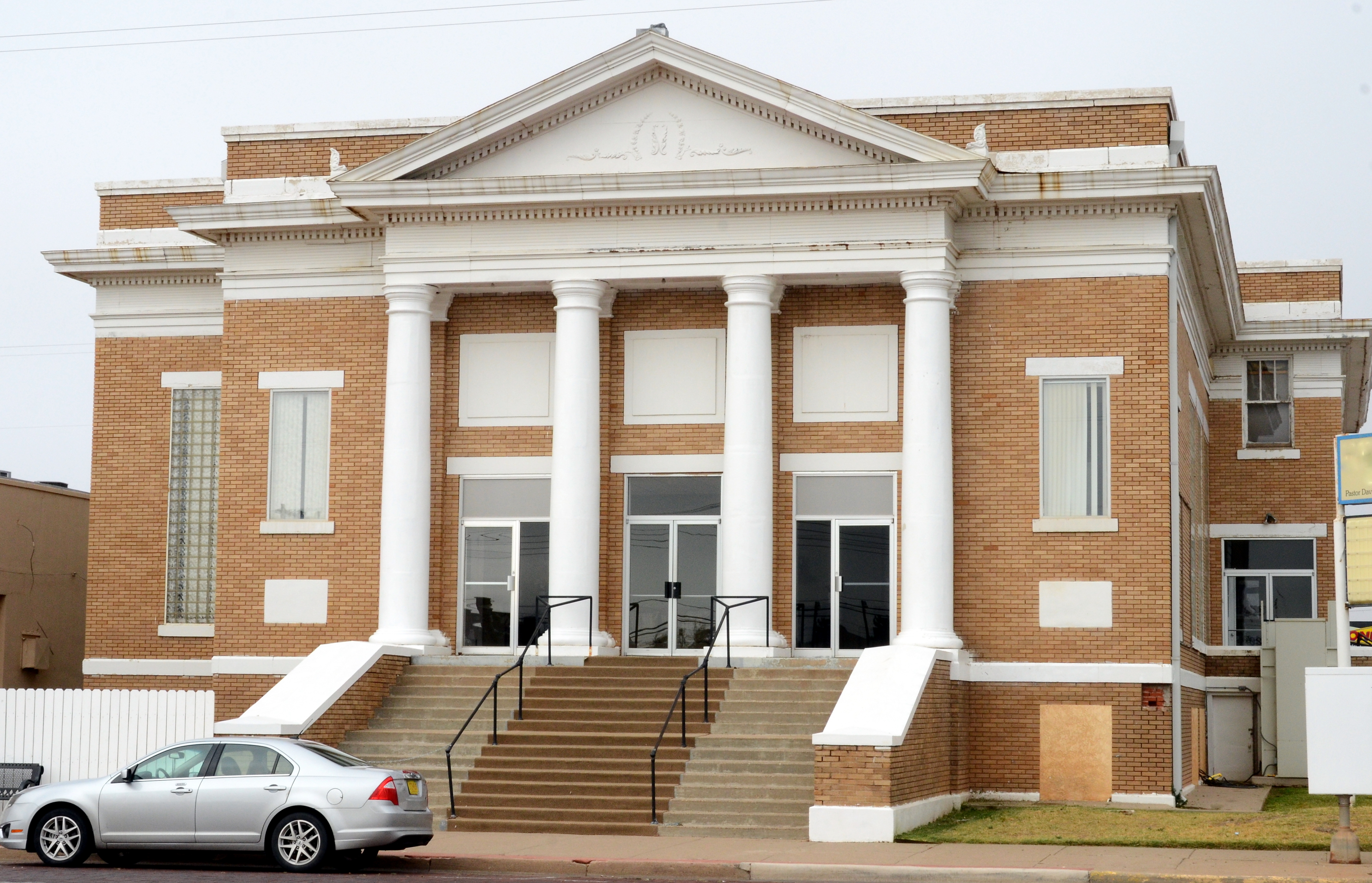

- Location within New Mexico Location within the United States
- Location: 622 Main St., Clovis, New Mexico
- Coordinates: 34°24′15″N 103°12′19″W
- Area: less than one acre
- Built: 1929
- Architect: Cramer, C.B.
- Architectural style: Classical Revival
- NRHP reference No.: 87001112
- NMSRCP No.: 1379

Significant dates
- Added to NRHP: July 2, 1987
- Designated NMSRCP: May 15, 1987

The First Methodist Church of Clovis is a historic church building at 622 Main Street in Clovis, New Mexico.

It was built in 1929 in a Classical Revival style and was added to the National Register in 1987.

Prior to 1930, it was originally known as Faith Christian Fellowship, and was constructed by church members at cost of $100,000.

== See also ==
- National Register of Historic Places in Curry County, New Mexico

The church was not known as Faith Christian Fellowship. Reference to correct information is found in The Clovis Book in Carver Public Library or First United Methodist Church historical documents housed in its history center.
