= First Methodist Church (Clinton, Massachusetts) =

Historic church in Massachusetts, United States

- U.S. National Register of Historic Places
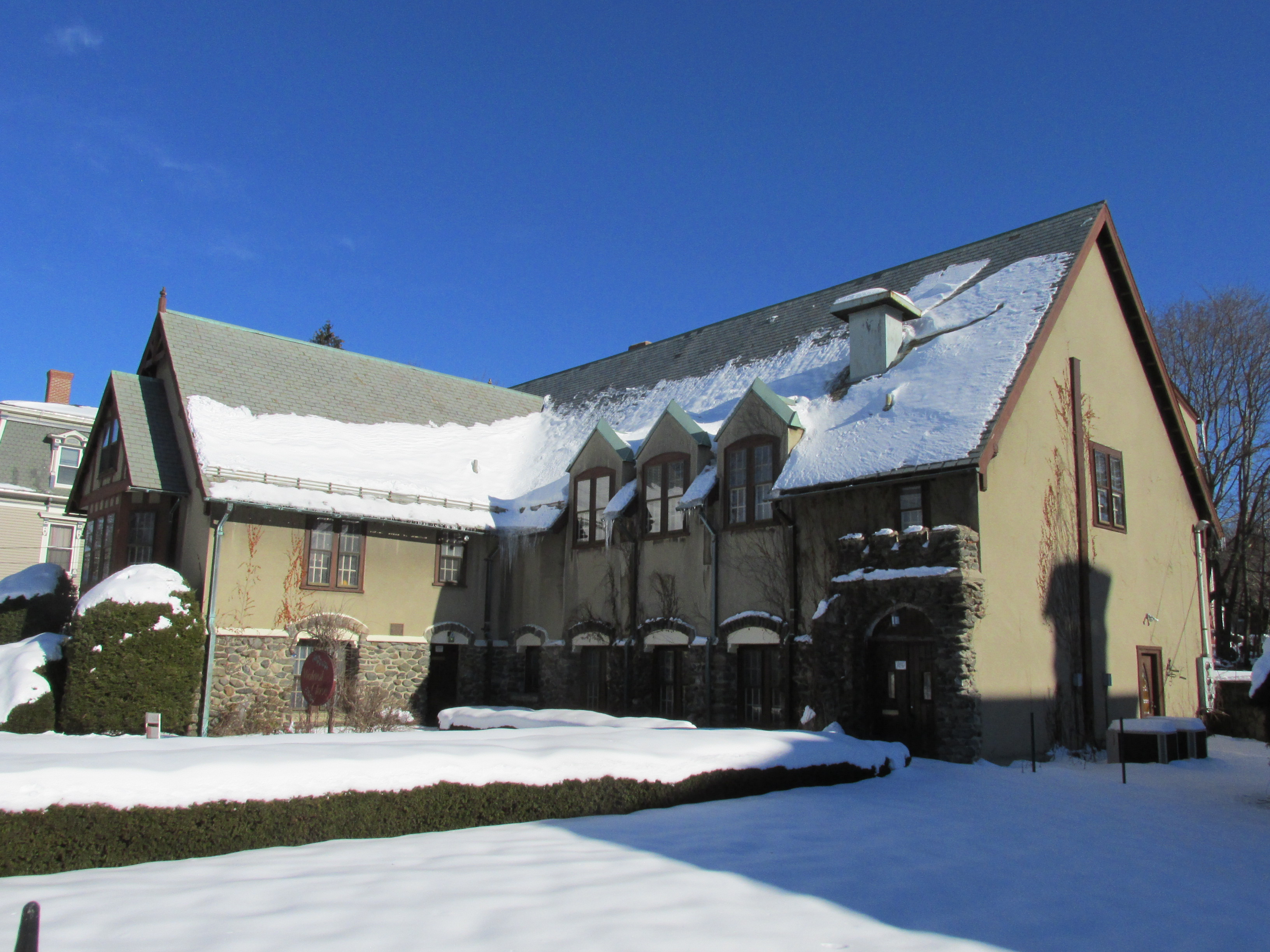
- Second Meeting House of the United Methodists

- Location within Massachusetts Location within the United States
- Location: 75 Walnut St., Clinton, Massachusetts
- Coordinates: 42°25′0″N 71°41′3″W
- Area: less than one acre
- Built: 1926
- Architect: Woodbury & Stuart
- Architectural style: Colonial Revival, Tudor Revival
- NRHP reference No.: 90001720
- Added to NRHP: November 02, 1990

The First Methodist Church is a historic Methodist church building at 75 Walnut Street in Clinton, Massachusetts. It is an L-shaped stone and stucco structure, two stories in height, with a steeply pitched slate roof. The ground floor is finished in uncoursed fieldstone. One entrance is set recessed behind a segmented stone arch at the southern end of the main facade, with a second entrance at the projecting gable at the northern end. The church was designed by Woodbury and Stuart of Boston, and construction of the building was begun in 1927 for a congregation established in 1830. The complete plan for the building was never realized due to a lack of funding, and only the community center and rectory were completed. These were used by the congregation, the community center space acting as sanctuary, until the 1980s. The building was rehabilitated in 1988, and how houses two residences and office space.

The church was listed on the National Register of Historic Places in 1990.

== See also ==
- National Register of Historic Places listings in Worcester County, Massachusetts
