= Temple B'nai Shalom (Brookhaven, Mississippi) =

Former synagogue, now museum, in Lincoln County, Mississippi, US

- Location in Mississippi

Religion
- Affiliation: Judaism (former)
- Ecclesiastical or organizational status: Synagogue (1894–2009); History museum (since 2009)
- Ownership: Lincoln County Historical and Genealogical Society
- Status: Closed (as a synagogue); Repurposed

Location
- Location: 227 South Church Street, Brookhaven, Lincoln County, Mississippi
- Country: United States
- Interactive map of Temple B'nai Shalom
- Coordinates: 31°34′41″N 90°26′48″W

Architecture
- Type: Synagogue architecture
- Style: Moorish Revival
- Established: 1894 (as a congregation)
- Completed: 1896
- Materials: Clapboard

Temple B'nai Shalom (transliterated from Hebrew as "Sons / Children of Peace") is a former synagogue in Brookhaven, Lincoln County, Mississippi, in the United States. The building has been used as a history museum since 2009, operated as Lincoln County Historical and Genealogical Society Museum.

== History ==
The congregation formed in 1894; and a synagogue building was erected at Chickasaw and South Church Streets in 1896. The synagogue was deconsecrated in 2009 and the congregation donated the building to the Lincoln County Historical and Genealogical Society to be used as a county history museum.

== Architecture ==
The white clapboard building is notable for its Moorish Revival Horseshoe arch windows, and for a truncated tower that "references the porthole of an Islamic minaret" with a slender Horseshoe arch window.
