= First Methodist Church (Alexandria, Louisiana) =

Historic church in Louisiana, United States

- U.S. National Register of Historic Places
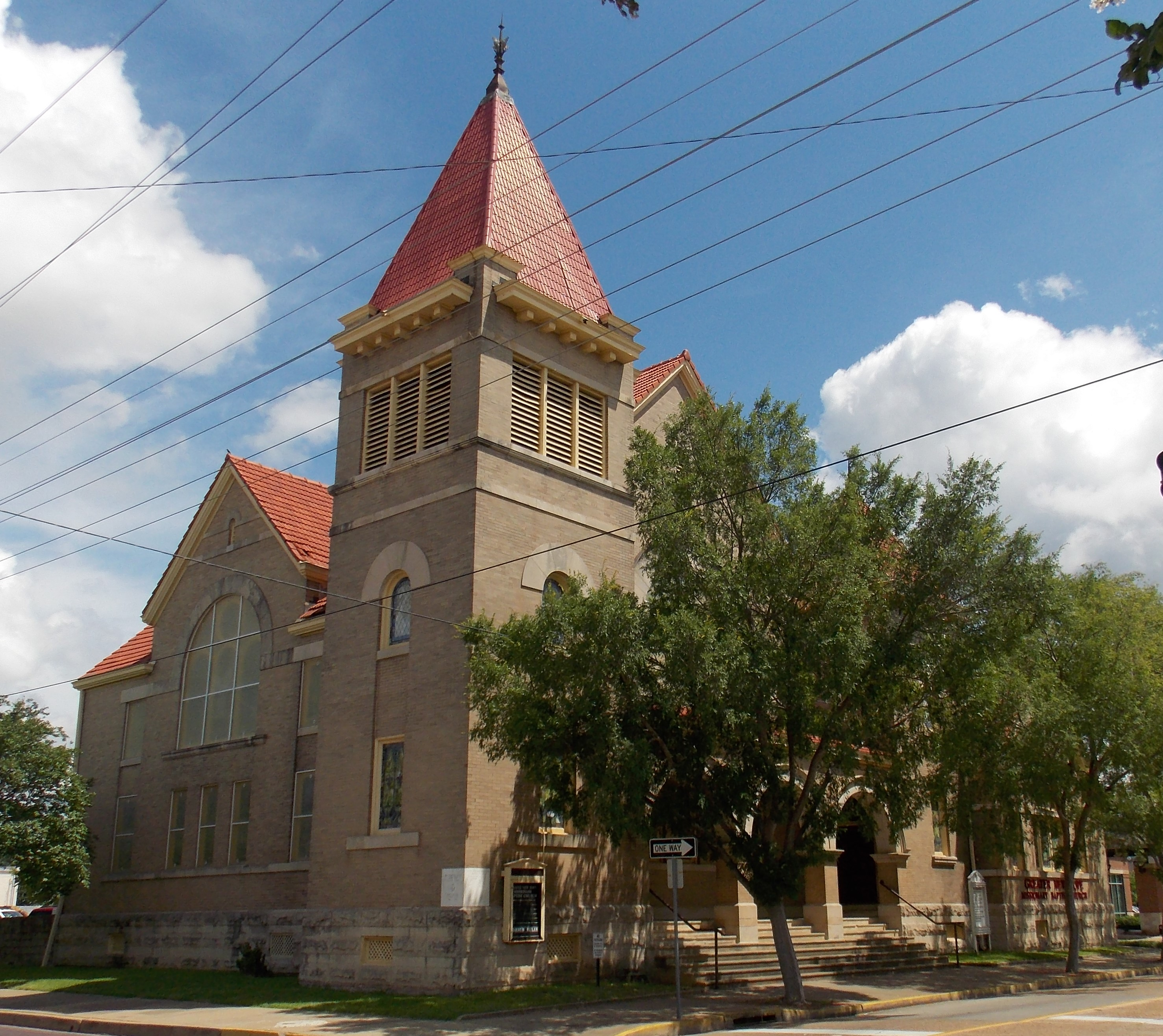

- Location within Louisiana Location within the United States
- Location: 630 Jackson St. Alexandria, Louisiana
- Coordinates: 31°18′37″N 92°26′54″W
- Area: less than one acre
- Built: 1907
- Architect: Matthews, W.E.
- Architectural style: Romanesque
- NRHP reference No.: 80001751
- Added to NRHP: June 6, 1980

The First Methodist Church in Alexandria, Louisiana was built in 1907. It was added to the National Register of Historic Places in 1980.

It was deemed notable in part as it is "the city's only monumental example of the Romanesque Revival. Other churches are designed in the Gothic or Classical style. Other buildings have Romanesque features, but these are merely commercial buildings with applied features. Unlike the church they do not have towers, arcades, or the proper Romanesque massing."

It originally served the First Methodist Church of Alexandria; it had served two other congregations and then the Greater New Hope Baptist Church by 1980.
