= First Methodist Church of Batavia =

Historic church in Illinois, United States

- U.S. National Register of Historic Places
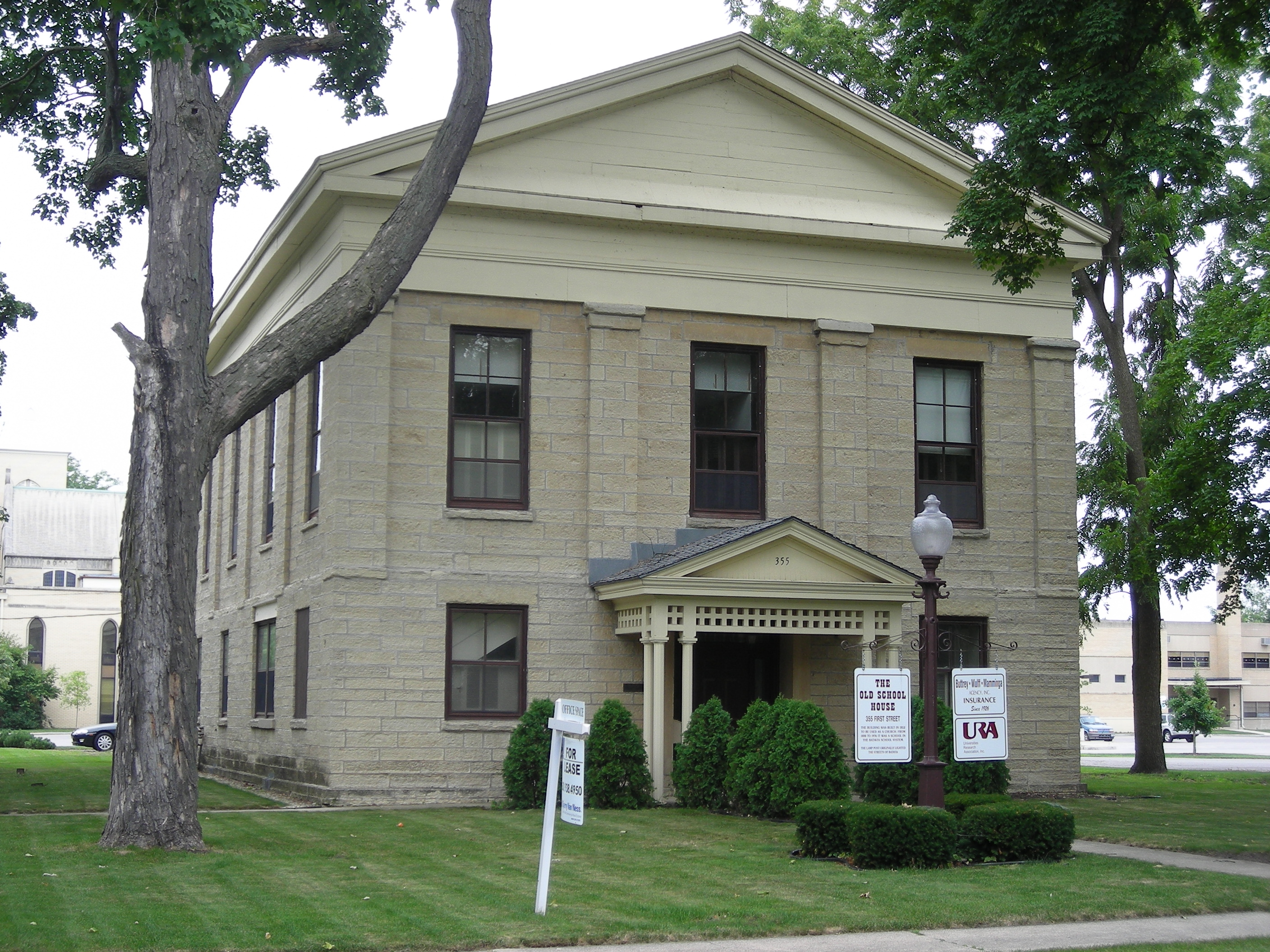

- Location within Illinois Location within the United States
- Location: Batavia, Kane County, Illinois, United States
- Coordinates: 41°50′54″N 88°18′50″W
- Built: 1852
- Architectural style: Greek Revival
- NRHP reference No.: 82002546
- Added to NRHP: March 19, 1982

The First Methodist Church of Batavia is a historic building in Batavia, Illinois. It functioned as a Methodist church until the 1880s. The building was then converted into the McWayne School Annex, which held classes until 1978. It was listed on the National Register of Historic Places in 1982.

== History ==
Batavia, Illinois was first settled in the 1830s. In 1834, Henry Lyon and Allison Speer were the first two Methodists to move to the village. A third Methodist, William VanNortwick, arrived a year later and allowed church services to be held in his house. As Batavia grew, the size of the congregation became too large to hold in a single house, and plans were made to construct a church building. The First Methodist Church of Batavia was constructed in 1852 for $6,000.

In 1854, Reverend E. H. Gammon was named the first minister. Gammon later accumulated much wealth in agricultural machinery and offered funds for the construction of a newer church. Upon the completion of the new United Methodist Church of Batavia, the original church building was sold to the Batavia Community School District. The old building was re-purposed as the McWayne School Annex and it was used as a school. In 1978, the school district opened two new schools and intended to destroy the McWayne School Annex. The plans were cancelled that year when it was purchased by the Buttrey-Wulff-Mamminga Agency, Inc. It was added to the National Register of Historic Places on March 19, 1982.

The Greek Revival structure was built of locally quarried limestone. The building retains its original wood gable, but it has been covered with asphalt for economic reasons. The bell tower was removed when it was converted into a school. Doric pediments adorn the north and south ends of the building. The interior features eight wooden columns.
