= Hardy House (Little Rock, Arkansas) =

Historic house in Arkansas, United States

- U.S. National Register of Historic Places
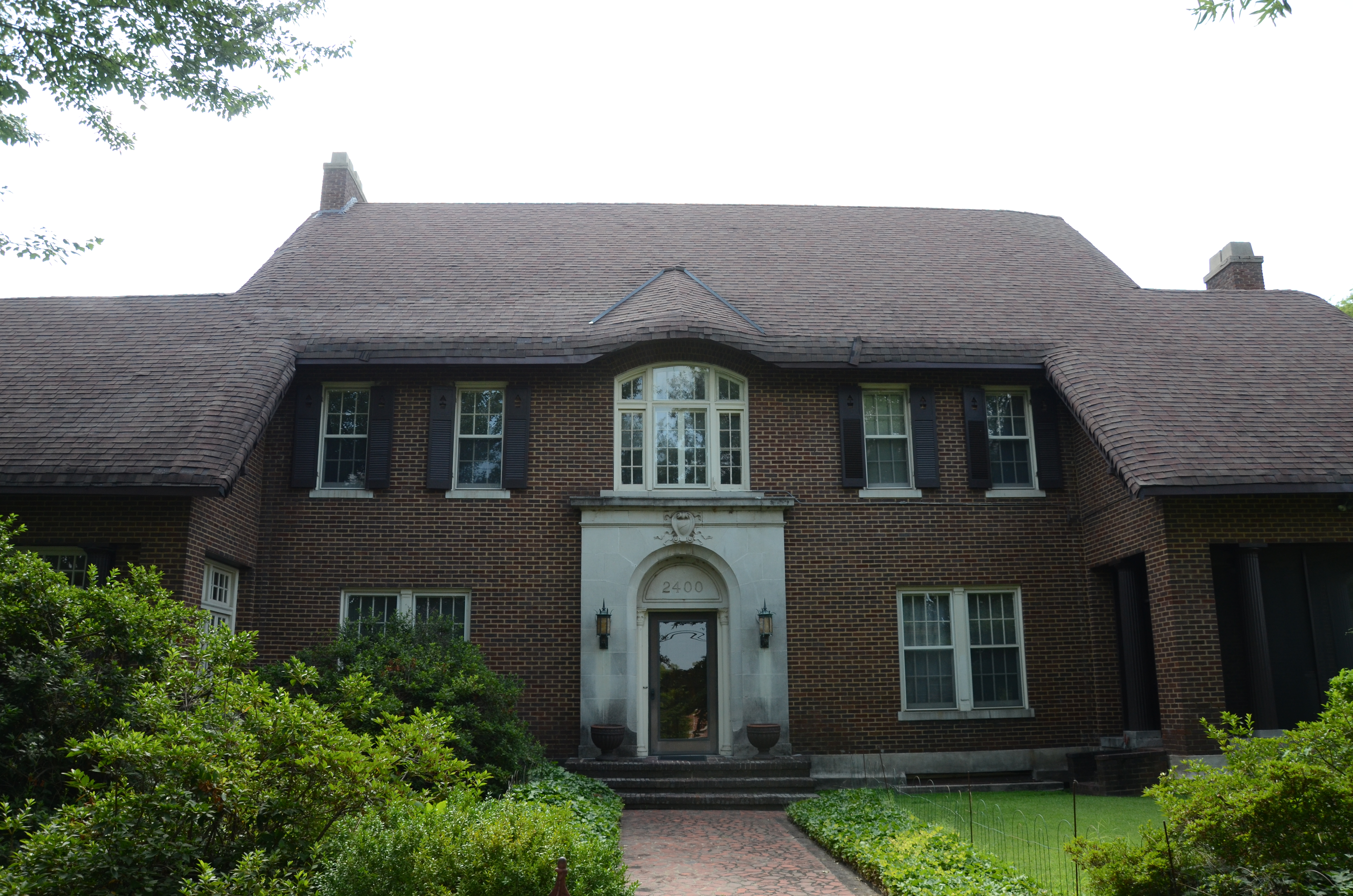

- Location within Arkansas Location within the United States
- Location: 2400 Broadway, Little Rock, Arkansas
- Coordinates: 34°43′31″N 92°16′44″W
- Area: less than one acre
- Built: 1921
- Architect: Charles L. Thompson
- Architectural style: English Country House
- MPS: Thompson, Charles L., Design Collection TR
- NRHP reference No.: 82000898
- Added to NRHP: December 22, 1982

The Hardy House is a historic house at 2400 Broadway in Little Rock, Arkansas. It is a two-story brick structure, with flanking single-story wings and a roof that is designed to resemble an English country house's thatched roof. The entrance is set in a centrally located stone round arch, with a multipart segmented-arch window above. The house was designed by Charles L. Thompson and built in 1921.

The house was listed on the National Register of Historic Places in 1982.

== See also ==
- National Register of Historic Places listings in Little Rock, Arkansas
