= First Methodist Church (Brookhaven, Mississippi) =

Historic church in Mississippi, United States

- U.S. National Register of Historic Places
- Location within Mississippi Location within the United States
- Location: 215 W. Cherokee St., Brookhaven, Mississippi
- Coordinates: 31°34′43″N 90°26′44″W
- Area: less than one acre
- Built: 1916
- Built by: I.C. Garber
- Architect: John Gaisford
- Architectural style: Classical Revival
- NRHP reference No.: 97001298
- Added to NRHP: November 17, 1997

First Methodist Church is a historic Methodist church building at 215 W. Cherokee Street in Brookhaven, Mississippi.

It was built in 1916 and added to the National Register in 1997.
