= J. Kim Sessums =

American artist and physician

- Born: Joey Kim Sessums

Joey Kim Sessums is an American artist and physician, best known for his sculptures. Sessums resides in Brookhaven, Mississippi.

Sessums earned his medical degree at the University of Mississippi. The University later installed his six-foot statue of University of Mississippi football coach Johnny Vaught on the campus.

Andrew Wyeth offered to pose for Sessums. When the sculpture was finished, Wyeth remarked,

We've done it. I think we've really got something here. This is why I waited. The other works just didn't have the bite yours does.

Sessums' sculptures of Wyeth, Eudora Welty and Billy Graham were parts of those individuals' personal collections.

Sessums was honored with a Mississippi Senate resolution in 2004 for his work on the then recently dedicated African-American Monument in the Vicksburg National Military Park, commissioned by the National Park Service.

Sessums sculpted the Cellular South Howell Trophy, which is given to the top four-year college men's basketball player in Mississippi. He also sculptured the Cellular South Gillom Trophy, which is given to the top four-year college women's basketball player in Mississippi.

== Personal life ==
Sessums has four children with his wife, Kristy. His daughter, also named Joey Sessums, is a pediatric dentist. Though he is best known as an artist, he maintains his medical practice. His brother is writer Kevin Sessums.
