= First Methodist Church (Oshkosh, Wisconsin) =

Historic church in Wisconsin, United States

- U.S. National Register of Historic Places
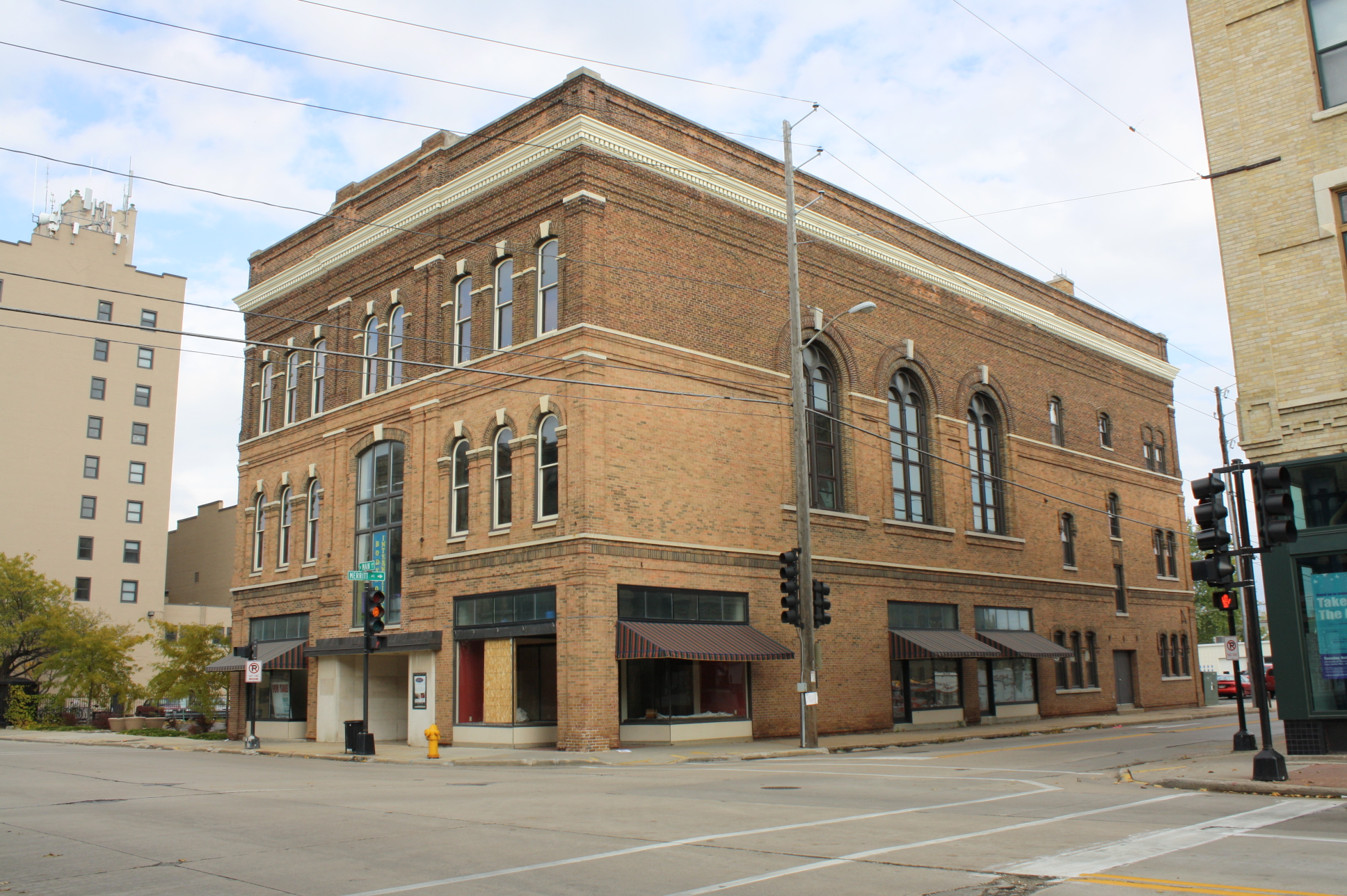

- Location within Wisconsin Location within the United States
- Location: 502 N. Main St., Oshkosh, Wisconsin
- Coordinates: 44.02°N 88.536944°W
- Area: less than one acre
- Built: 1874-75, 1924-25
- Architect: William Walters (original); Auler & Jensen (1924 renovation)
- Architectural style: Classical Revival, Italianate
- NRHP reference No.: 95000247
- Added to NRHP: March 17, 1995

The First Methodist Church in Oshkosh, Wisconsin is a historic church at 502 N. Main Street. It was built as the Wagner Opera House. The main structure was built in Italianate style 1874-75 but it was renovated extensively to its current Neoclassical appearance in 1924–25. It was added to the National Register of Historic Places in 1995.

It is a brick building. It is unusual in Wisconsin as an urban church building with storefronts at street-level. The building was begun as an opera house, until damaged by a fire in 1874. At that point the Methodist congregation bought it and completed it as a Neo-Classical-styled church. After they moved to a new building in 1970, it was used by Boys' Club and as a homeless shelter.
