= First Methodist Church (Tupelo, Mississippi) =

Historic church in Mississippi, United States

- U.S. National Register of Historic Places
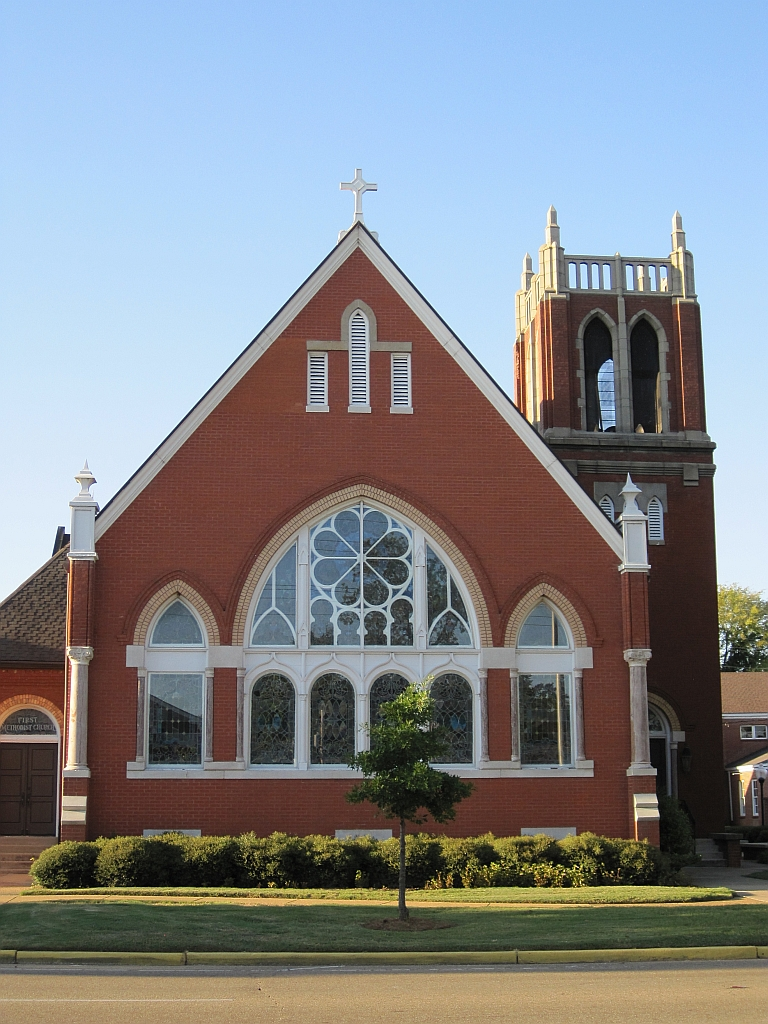

- Location within Mississippi Location within the United States
- Location: 412 W. Main St., Tupelo, Mississippi
- Coordinates: 34°15′28″N 88°42′27″W
- Area: 1.6 acres (0.65 ha)
- Built: 1899
- Architectural style: Gothic Revival
- NRHP reference No.: 90000348
- Added to NRHP: March 15, 1990

First Methodist Church (First United Methodist Church) is a historic church building at 412 W. Main Street in Tupelo, Mississippi.

It was built in 1899 in a Gothic Revival style. The building was added to the National Register of Historic Places in 1990.
