= Beth-El =

Bethel (Hebrew: בֵּית אֵל "House of God") is a biblical site.

Beth-El, Beth El or Beit El may refer to the following Jewish synagogues:

== Canada ==
- Beth El Synagogue (Newfoundland)

== China ==
- Beth El Synagogue (Shanghai)

== Israel ==
- Beit El Kabbalist yeshiva

== India ==
- Beth El Synagogue (Kolkata)

== Morocco ==
- Temple Beth-El (Casablanca)

== New Zealand ==
- Beth El Synagogue, Christchurch

== United States ==
(by state then city)

=== Alabama ===
- Temple Beth-El (Anniston, Alabama)
- Temple Beth-El (Birmingham, Alabama)

=== Connecticut ===
- Beth El Synagogue (Waterbury, Connecticut)

=== Florida ===
- Temple Beth-El (Pensacola, Florida)

=== Illinois ===
- North Suburban Synagogue Beth El (Highland Park)

=== Maryland ===
- Congregation Beth El (Bethesda, Maryland)
- Beth El Congregation (Pikesville, Maryland)

=== Michigan ===
- Temple Beth El (Alpena, Michigan)
- Temple Beth El (Detroit)

=== Minnesota ===
- Beth El Synagogue (St. Louis Park, Minnesota)

=== Missouri ===
- Temple Beth El (Jefferson City, Missouri)

=== New Jersey ===
- Temple Beth-El (Jersey City, New Jersey)
- Congregation Beth El (Voorhees, New Jersey)

=== New York ===
- Temple Beth-El (New York City)
- Beth El Jewish Center of Flatbush (Brooklyn, New York)
- Young Israel Beth El of Borough Park (Brooklyn, New York)
- Temple Beth-El (Great Neck, New York)
- Temple Beth-El (Hornell, New York)
- Temple Beth El of Northern Westchester (Chappaqua)
- Temple Beth El (Syracuse, New York)
- Temple Beth-El (Tonawanda, New York) (merged)

=== Pennsylvania ===
- Beth El Temple (Harrisburg)

=== Rhode Island ===
- Temple Beth-El (Providence, Rhode Island)

=== Tennessee ===
- Anshei Sphard Beth El Emeth Congregation

=== Texas ===
- Congregation Beth Israel (Austin, Texas)
- Temple Beth-El (Corsicana, Texas)
- Temple Beth-El (San Antonio)

=== Virginia ===
- Beth El Hebrew Congregation (Alexandria, Virginia)
- Beth El Congregation (Winchester, Virginia)
- Temple Beth El (Suffolk, Virginia)

=== Wisconsin ===
- Temple Beth El (Madison, Wisconsin)

== Venezuela ==
- Bet-El Synagogue (Caracas)

== See also ==
- Bethel (disambiguation)
- Beit El Synagogue
