= Bethel (disambiguation) =

Bethel was a city described in the Hebrew Bible.

Bethel, Beth El, Beth-El, or Beit El may also refer to:

== People ==
- Bethel (surname)
- Bethel Coopwood (1827–1907), an officer in the Confederate Army in the American Civil War
- Bethel Johnson (born 1979), a former American football wide receiver.
- Bethel Leslie (1929–1999), an American actress and screenwriter
- Bethell Robinson (1861–1933), an English footballer
- Bethel Rucker (1862–1945), one of the Rucker Brothers who helped found the city of Everett, Washington
- Bethel Solomons (1885–1965), an Irish medical doctor and international rugby player
- Bethel Henry Strousberg (1823–1884), a German Jewish industrialist

== Places ==
=== Australia ===
- Bethel, South Australia

=== Canada ===
- Bethel, Grey County, Ontario
- Bethel, Leeds and Grenville United Counties, Ontario
- Bethel, Kawartha Lakes, Ontario
- Bethel, Prince Edward Island

=== Germany ===
- Bethel, part of Gadderbaum, Bielefeld

=== Guatemala ===
- Bethel, El Petén, a small town on the Guatemala-Mexico border

=== Israel/West Bank ===
- Bethel, an ancient city
- Beit El, a modern settlement

=== Trinidad and Tobago ===
- Bethel, Tobago, village in Tobago, Trinidad and Tobago

=== United Kingdom ===
- Bethel, Anglesey, Wales
- Bethel, Cornwall, near St Austell, England
- Bethel, Gwynedd, Wales

=== United States ===
- Bethel, Alaska
  - Bethel Airport
  - Bethel Census Area, Alaska
- Bethel, Clarke County, Virginia
- Bethel, Connecticut, a New England town
  - Bethel (CDP), Connecticut, the main village in the town
  - Bethel (Metro-North station)
- Bethel, Delaware
- Bethel, Florida
- Bethel, Delaware County, Indiana
- Bethel, Wayne County, Indiana
- Bethel, Maine, a New England town
  - Bethel (CDP), Maine, the main village in the town
- Bethel, Minnesota
- Bethel, Missouri
- Bethel, New York, a town in Sullivan County
- Bethel, Pine Plains, New York, a hamlet in Dutchess County
- Bethel, North Carolina
- Bethel, Ohio
- Bethel, Oklahoma (disambiguation)
- Bethel, Oregon (disambiguation)
- Bethel, Pennsylvania (disambiguation)
- Bethel, South Carolina
- Bethel, Anderson County, Texas
- Bethel, Henderson County, Texas
- Bethel, Vermont, a New England town
  - Bethel (CDP), Vermont, the main village in the town
- Bethel, Washington
- Bethel, Wisconsin
- Bethel Island (California)
- Bethel Springs, Tennessee
- Bethel Township (disambiguation)

== Education ==
- Beit El yeshiva (Bethel Yeshiva), Bet El, Israel
- Bethel Bible College in Topeka, Kansas
- Bethel University (Indiana) in Mishawaka, Indiana
- Bethel College (Kansas) in North Newton, Kansas
- Bethel College (Kentucky) in Hopkinsville and Russellville, Kentucky
- Bethel High School (disambiguation)
- Bethel Junior High School in Spanaway, Washington
- Bethel Park School District in Bethel Park, Pennsylvania
- Bethel School District (Oregon)
- Bethel School District (Washington)
- Bethel School (disambiguation), historic sites in Florida and in Kansas
- Bethel University (Minnesota) in Arden Hills, Minnesota
- Bethel University (Tennessee) in McKenzie, Tennessee

== Religion ==
- Beth-El (disambiguation), Synagogues named Beth-El or Beth El
- Bethel, any branch office operated by the Watch Tower Society or other corporation associated with Jehovah's Witnesses
- Bethel, a Job's Daughters International chapter
- Bethel (god), the name of a god or an aspect of a god in some ancient middle-eastern texts
- Bethel African Methodist Episcopal Church (disambiguation)
- Bethel Baptist Church (disambiguation)
- Bethel Church (disambiguation), one of several denominations or churches
- Seamen's Bethel, chapel in New Bedford, Massachusetts

== Other ==
- Battle of Big Bethel, part of the blockade of Chesapeake Bay during the American Civil War
- Bethel Music, American worship group and record label
- Bethel School District v. Fraser, a United States Supreme Court decision involving free speech and public schools
- Bethel Heights Vineyard, winery in the Willamette Valley of Oregon
- Bethel Institution, hospital for the mentally ill in Bielefeld, Germany
- Baetylus, or Bethel, a type of meteoric sacred stone
- Mount Bethel (Colorado), a mountain in Colorado
