= Bethel Christian School =

Bethel Christian School may refer to:

In the United States:

- Bethel Christian School (California)
- Bethel Christian School (Pennsylvania)

In Australia:

- Bethel Christian School (Albany, Western Australia)

== See also ==
- Bethel High School (disambiguation)
- Bethel School (disambiguation)
- Bethel (disambiguation)
