= Bithell =

Bithell is a surname. Notable people with the surname include:

- Bert Bithell (1900–1969), English footballer
- Brian Bithell (born 1956), English footballer
- Mike Bithell (born 1985), British video game developer
- Richard Bithell (1821–1902), English agnostic philosopher and writer
- Stuart Bithell (born 1986), British sailor

== See also ==
- Bethell, another surname
