= Hugh Bethell =

Hugh Bethell may refer to:

- Hugh Bethell (died 1679) (1615–1679), English Member of Parliament (MP) for East Riding and Hedon
- Hugh Bethell (died 1717) English MP for Hedon, son of above
- Hugh Bethell (died 1747) English MP for Pontefract
- Hugh Bethell (died 1772) English MP for Beverley
- Hugh Bethell (British Army officer) (1882–1947), British general

== See also ==
- Bethell
