= Bethel High School =

Bethel High School may refer to:

United States

- Bethel High School (Connecticut), located in Bethel, Connecticut
- Bethel High School (Ohio), located in Tipp City, Ohio
- Bethel High School (Oklahoma), located in Shawnee, Oklahoma
- Bethel High School (Virginia), located in Hampton, Virginia
- Bethel High School (Washington), located in Spanaway, Washington
- Bethel-Tate High School in Bethel, Ohio
- Bethel Park High School in Bethel Park, Pennsylvania
- Jesse M. Bethel High School in Vallejo, California
- Bethel Regional High School in Bethel, Alaska

Hong Kong

- Bethel High School (Hong Kong)

== See also ==
- Bethel Christian School (disambiguation) (many have high school divisions)
- Bethel School (disambiguation)
- Bethel (disambiguation)
