= List of tornadoes in the outbreak of May 18–21, 2013 =

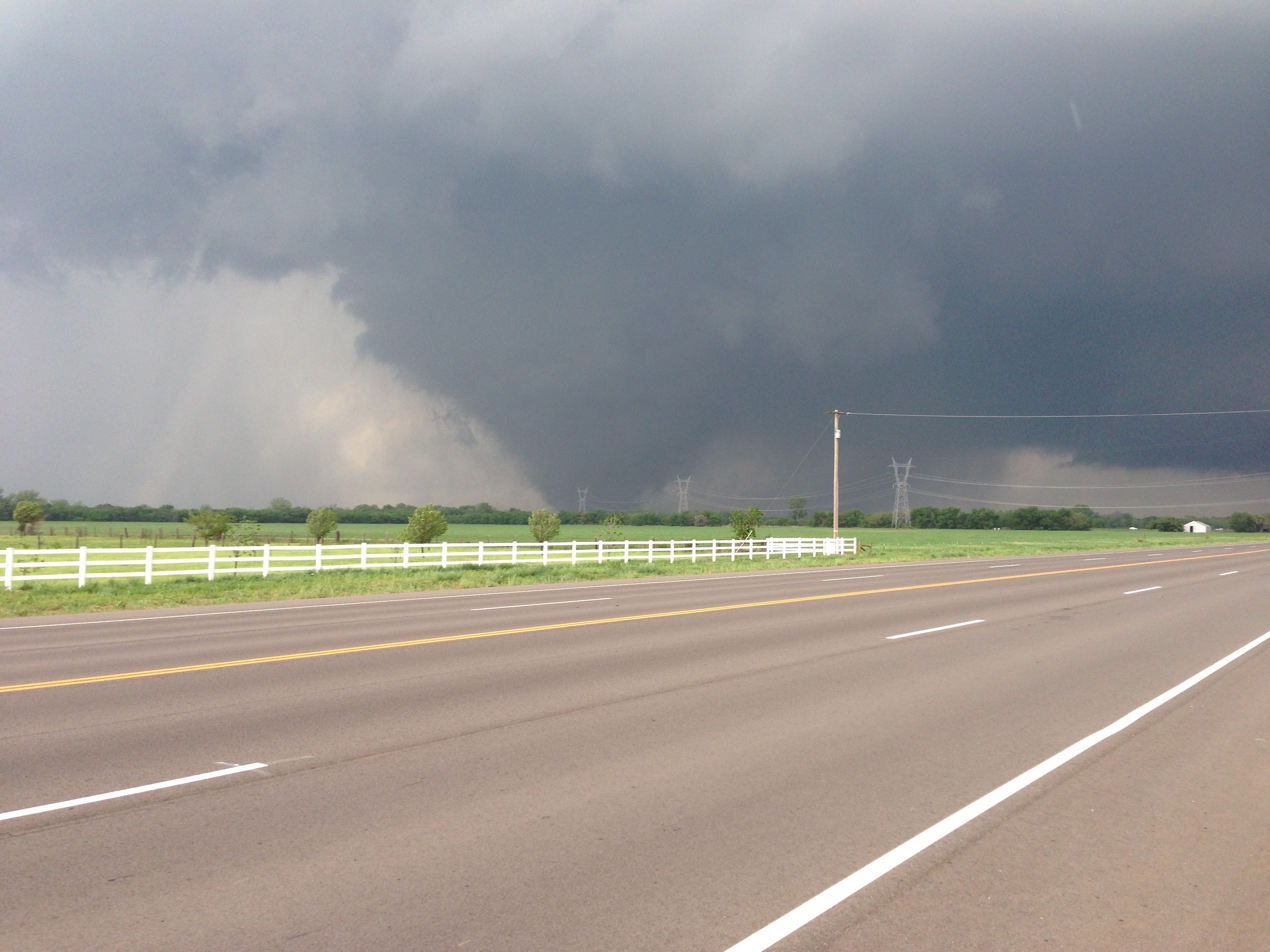
The tornado that affected Moore, Oklahoma, and surrounding areas on May 20, 2013.

From May 18–21, 2013, a significant tornado outbreak took place across parts of the Midwestern United States and lower Great Plains. This event occurred just days after a deadly outbreak struck Texas and surrounding southern states on May 15. On May 16, a slow moving trough crossed the Rockies and traversed the western Great Plains. Initially, activity was limited to scattered severe storms; however, by May 18, the threat for organized severe thunderstorms and tornadoes greatly increased. A few tornadoes touched down that day in Kansas and Nebraska, including an EF4 tornado near Rozel, Kansas. Maintaining its slow eastward movement, the system produced another round of severe weather nearby. Activity significantly increased on May 19, with tornadoes confirmed in Oklahoma, Kansas, Iowa, Missouri, and Illinois. In Oklahoma, two strong tornadoes (one rated EF4) caused significant damage in rural areas of the eastern Oklahoma City metropolitan area; two people lost their lives in Shawnee. The most horrific events unfolded on May 20 as a large EF5 tornado devastated parts of Moore, Oklahoma, with 24 people killed. Thousands of structures were destroyed, with many being completely flattened. Several other tornadoes occurred during the day in areas further eastward, though the majority were weak and caused little damage.

The severe threat shifted towards damaging straight-line winds on May 21 as a large squall line developed across the southern states. Further north in Ontario, three tornadoes, including one that was rated EF2, touched down. Over the following five days, the system responsible for the outbreak moved very little across the Eastern United States. By May 24, it virtually stalled off the coast of New England, resulting in several days of heavy rain across the region. It later moved northeastward and was last noted by the Weather Prediction Center late on May 26 over southeastern Canada. During the storm's eleven-day trek across the United States, it produced 75 tornadoes, 4 of which were rated EF3 or higher. Over 1,000 reports of damaging winds were received by the Storm Prediction Center as well. The system's slow movement also resulted in record-breaking rains in North Dakota, New York, and Vermont. Additionally, during the overnight of May 25 – 26, unusually cold air behind the cyclone resulting in record-late snows across northern New England.

== Confirmed tornadoes ==
Confirmed tornadoes by Enhanced Fujita rating
EFU	EF0	EF1	EF2	EF3	EF4	EF5	Total
0	37	32	5	1	2	1	78

=== May 18 event ===
List of confirmed tornadoes – Saturday, May 18, 2013 (Note: All dates are based on the local time zone where the tornado touched down; however, all times are in Coordinated Universal Time for consistency.)
EF#	Location	County / Parish	State	Start Coord.	Time (UTC)	Path length	Max width	Summary
EF0	WSW of Cedar Bluff Reservoir	Trego	KS	38.7602°N 99.8556°W	2227 – 2236	2.92 mi (4.70 km)	100 yd (91 m)	A tornado tracked over open fields and caused no damage.
EF0	N of Broadwater	Morrill	NE	41.7303°N 102.85°W	2258 – 2301	1 mi (1.6 km)	50 yd (46 m)	A brief tornado caused no damage.
EF0	NNW of Brownell	Ness	KS	38.6771°N 99.7453°W	2303 – 2305	0.31 mi (0.50 km)	100 yd (91 m)	A brief multiple-vortex tornado caused no damage.
EF1	SSW of Ellis	Ellis	KS	38.8509°N 99.5849°W	2309 – 2312	1.71 mi (2.75 km)	50 yd (46 m)	Several trees and power poles were damaged.
EF0	NW of Antonino	Ellis	KS	38.8259°N 99.4319°W	2337 – 2339	0.56 mi (0.90 km)	50 yd (46 m)	A brief tornado caused no damage.
EF4	W of Rozel	Pawnee	KS	38.1429°N 99.4706°W	0018 – 0047	7 mi (11 km)	1,100 yd (1,000 m)	Five farm houses were damaged by this large, cone-shaped tornado, one of which had most of its roof and some of its exterior walls destroyed at the house (the other four sustained minor damage). An outbuilding was destroyed, another outbuilding suffered minor damage, and a large 1,000 US gallons (3,800 L) propane tank was ripped off of its concrete foundation and tossed 0.25 mi (400 m). Many trees and power lines were downed, seven irrigation pivots were flipped, and part of a road was scoured as well. The EF4 rating was confirmed based on Doppler on Wheels surface wind observations of 165 to 185 mph (266 to 298 km/h).
EF1	ENE of Sanford	Pawnee	KS	38.2011°N 99.2768°W	0049 – 0101	4 mi (6.4 km)	100 yd (91 m)	This tornado developed to east of the previous event and damaged trees and power poles.
EF0	SSE of Ash Valley	Pawnee	KS	38.242°N 99.1818°W	0110 – 0113	2.06 mi (3.32 km)	100 yd (91 m)	This was the third tornado associated with the supercell that spawned the EF4 Rozel storm; no damage occurred.
EF1	NW of Clay Center	Clay, Washington	KS	39.486°N 97.278°W	0335 – 0345	6.99 mi (11.25 km)	75 yd (69 m)	Irrigation pivots were overturned, trees were downed, and outbuildings were destroyed.
EF0	Southern Washington	Washington	KS	39.811°N 97.056°W	0400 – 0402	0.34 mi (0.55 km)	50 yd (46 m)	Several trees were downed and large tree limbs were torn. A barn also lost its roof.

=== May 19 event ===
List of confirmed tornadoes – Sunday, May 19, 2013
EF#	Location	County / Parish	State	Start Coord.	Time (UTC)	Path length	Max width	Summary
EF0	SW of Viola	Sumner	KS	37.4504°N 97.6697°W	2010–2012	0.57 mi (0.92 km)	50 yd (46 m)	A brief tornado remained over open country, causing no damage.
EF0	E of Viola	Sedgwick	KS	37.4937°N 97.5864°W	2019–2024	0.8 mi (1.3 km)	50 yd (46 m)	A brief rope tornado moved over open country, causing no damage.
EF2	NNE of Clearwater	Sedgwick	KS	37.5797°N 97.5061°W	2037 – 2048	4.61 mi (7.42 km)	300 yd (270 m)	A silo was destroyed, a trailer was blown into outbuildings, and a brick home suffered roof damage. A 3,500 pounds (1,600 kg) horse trailer was rolled 220 yd (200 m), another trailer was rolled 50 to 75 yd (46 to 69 m), and two irrigation pivots were flipped over. A plank of wood was thrown through a car window and an outbuilding was moved off of its foundation. Several trees and power poles were downed as well. The Doppler on Wheels recorded peak winds of 155 miles per hour (249 km/h) at 230 feet (70 m) above ground level.
EF0	SW of Wellington	Sumner	KS	37.14°N 97.49°W	2112–2113	0.42 mi (0.68 km)	50 yd (46 m)	A trained spotter observed a brief tornado in an open field; no damage was reported.
EF1	Edmond	Oklahoma	OK	35.624°N 97.481°W	2122 – 2130	4.5 mi (7.2 km)	900 yd (820 m)	Twelve homes in the town were damaged, including three that sustained major damage. Nine transmission towers were also destroyed by the tornado and it was estimated that it would take a month to replace them.
EF1	SW of Arcadia	Oklahoma	OK	35.6534°N 97.3621°W	2133 - 2134	0.54 mi (0.87 km)	200 yd (180 m)	A power pole was damaged.
EF0	WSW of South Haven	Sumner	KS	37.05°N 97.40°W	2139–2141	0.47 mi (0.76 km)	50 yd (46 m)	A brief tornado was reported by a trained spotter; no damage occurred.
EF0	S of South Haven	Sumner	KS	37.0333°N 97.4151°W	2140–2141	0.4 mi (0.64 km)	50 yd (46 m)	A rope tornado was reported; no damage occurred.
EF3	NW of Luther to SE of Tryon	Oklahoma, Logan, Lincoln	OK	35.693°N 97.232°W	2141 – 2224	20.84 mi (33.54 km)	1,200 yd (1,100 m)	This large multiple-vortex wedge tornado destroyed an outbuilding and two mobile homes shortly after touching down. Along I-35, a hospital that was under-construction had windows blown out and its roof damaged. The tornado clipped the southeastern edge of Carney, damaging or destroying 40 homes and a few industrial buildings there. Power and water supply was knocked out to the town as well. Debris from Carney was reported to have fallen up to 55 mi (89 km) away in Hallett. Video of this tornado revealed extremely violent motions within the funnel, indicating that the tornado may have been stronger than EF3 intensity, but there were no damage indicators to confirm this. Four people were injured.
EF1	SE of Udall	Cowley	KS	37.3404°N 97.1549°W	2146 – 2148	0.71 mi (1.14 km)	50 yd (46 m)	A tornado that was reported by a spotter caused minor damage to a farmstead.
EF1	NE of Wolbach	Greeley	NE	41.439°N 98.365°W	2151 – 2153	0.23 mi (0.37 km)	25 yd (23 m)	A short-lived tornado destroyed a mobile home and shed. Several trees were downed as well.
EF1	E of Udall	Cowley	KS	37.3705°N 97.0941°W	2155 – 2159	1.84 mi (2.96 km)	60 yd (55 m)	Minor damage occurred at a farmstead.
EF0	SW of Ramona	Marion	KS	38.59°N 97.08°W	2205–2207	0.46 mi (0.74 km)	50 yd (46 m)	Law enforcement observed a brief tornado; no damage was reported.
EF0	N of Ramona	Dickinson	KS	38.59°N 97.08°W	2217	0.1 mi (0.16 km)	25 yd (23 m)	The Ramona volunteer police department reported a brief tornado touchdown; no damaged occurred.
EF1	SE of Emporia	Lyon	KS	38.3232°N 96.207°W	2227 – 2237	9 mi (14 km)	75 yd (69 m)	A home and an outbuilding were damaged just west of the Emporia Municipal Airport shortly after the tornado touched down. Sporadic tree damage occurred along the rest of the path.
EF0	N of Arkansas City	Cowley	KS	37.0944°N 97.056°W	2259–2300	0.19 mi (0.31 km)	50 yd (46 m)	A brief tornado moved over open country with no damage being reported.
EF4	E of Norman to ESE of McLoud	Cleveland, Pottawatomie	OK	35.2531°N 97.3001°W	2300 – 2350	23 mi (37 km)	1,500 yd (1,400 m)	2 deaths – See section on this tornado – Ten people were injured.
EF0	Southwestern Adel	Dallas	IA	41.5878°N 94.0668°W	2332 – 2335	2.08 mi (3.35 km)	100 yd (91 m)	A weak tornado, which formed within a very broad circulation, produced a short, intermittent path before dissipating prior to reaching populated areas of Adel.
EF0	N of Bethel Acres	Pottawatomie	OK	35.3365°N 97.0228°W	2340 - 2343	2 mi (3.2 km)	30 yd (27 m)	RaXPol mobile radar data confirmed that an anticyclonic tornado, which was a satellite to the long-tracked Lake Thunderbird–Shawnee EF4 tornado, damaged trees.
EF1	ESE of Dallas Center	Dallas	IA	41.6656°N 93.9073°W	2345 – 2348	1.43 mi (2.30 km)	100 yd (91 m)	A house suffered significant structural damage and numerous trees were downed.
EF0	WNW of Shamrock	Creek	OK	35.9323°N 96.6143°W	2347 - 2348	0.2 mi (0.32 km)	50 yd (46 m)	A brief tornado caused no damage.
EF2	W of Prague	Pottawatomie, Lincoln	OK	35.458°N 96.795°W	2359 – 0012	7.25 mi (11.67 km)	450 yd (410 m)	A house was pushed off of its cinder block foundation and numerous sheds/outbuildings were either damaged or destroyed. Two more houses lost much of their roofs and exterior walls and a fourth house suffered roof, wall, and window damage. A fifth house sustained minor roof damage, an RV was rolled, and many trees were downed.
EF1	SSE of Slater to SSE of Huxley	Polk, Story	IA	41.8463°N 93.6687°W	0007 – 0012	4.71 mi (7.58 km)	150 yd (140 m)	An intermittent tornado removed a garage and part of the roof from a manufactured home.
EF1	NNE of Prague to NW of Welty	Lincoln, Okfuskee, Creek	OK	35.5323°N 96.6538°W	0017 – 0040	14.42 mi (23.21 km)	700 yd (640 m)	Barns and outbuildings were damaged and numerous trees were downed.
EF0	E of Argo Fay	Carroll	IL	42.00°N 89.99°W	0102	0.1 mi (0.16 km)	50 yd (46 m)	Emergency management reported a brief tornado; no damage was reported.

=== May 20 event ===
List of confirmed tornadoes – Monday, May 20, 2013
EF#	Location	County / Parish	State	Start Coord.	Time (UTC)	Path length	Max width	Summary
EF1	E of Carthage	Jasper	MO	37.1672°N 94.2801°W	0506 – 0508	0.5 mi (0.80 km)	100 yd (91 m)	A brief tornado downed numerous trees and power lines. Outbuildings were destroyed as well.
EF1	WNW of Lockwood	Dade	MO	37.3881°N 93.9668°W	0523 – 0524	0.65 mi (1.05 km)	100 yd (91 m)	A grocery store suffered roof damage, a carport was thrown, and several trees were uprooted.
EF5	NW of Newcastle to E of Moore	McClain, Cleveland	OK	35.284°N 97.628°W	1956 – 2035	13.85 mi (22.29 km)	1,900 yd (1,700 m)	24 deaths – See article on this tornado – 212 people were injured and there was one additional death due to natural causes that was indirectly related to the tornado. The tornado took a path similar to the May 3, 1999 Bridge Creek – Moore F5 tornado.
EF0	SSE of Marlow	Stephens	OK	34.5564°N 97.9129°W	1958 – 2001	1 mi (1.6 km)	30 yd (27 m)	Storm chasers reported a brief tornado; no known damage occurred.
EF1	Southern Marlow to W of Hope	Stephens	OK	34.5965°N 97.9331°W	2007 – 2022	4 mi (6.4 km)	200 yd (180 m)	A tornado was observed by several storm chasers and spotters. Trees and power lines suffered minor damage.
EF1	SSW of Avant to WNW of Vera	Osage, Washington	OK	36.4185°N 96.0778°W	2051 – 2105	6.5 mi (10.5 km)	500 yd (460 m)	A high-end EF1 tornado downed numerous trees, one of which fell onto the roof of a home.
EF0	SW of Dearing	Montgomery	KS	37.03°N 95.74°W	2112–2114	0.54 mi (0.87 km)	50 yd (46 m)	A brief tornado remained over open country and caused no damage.
EF1	ESE of Ramona	Washington	OK	36.4923°N 95.8971°W	2121 – 2130	4.5 mi (7.2 km)	400 yd (370 m)	A couple of homes were damaged and several trees were downed.
EF1	ENE of Ramona to NNW of Talala	Washington, Rogers	OK	36.5504°N 95.8223°W	2133 – 2147	6 mi (9.7 km)	500 yd (460 m)	The tornado remained mostly over open country, but one home had roof damage, windows blown out, and a chimney that was ripped from the roof. A nearby metal-frame barn had large doors blown out on both sides as well.
EF0	N of Lake Brownwood	Brown	TX	31.86°N 99.01°W	2135 – 2149	1.17 mi (1.88 km)	50 yd (46 m)	A weak tornado caused no damage.
EF0	NE of Meeker	Lincoln	OK	35.5614°N 96.8146°W	2140 – 2142	1.21 mi (1.95 km)	100 yd (91 m)	A brief tornado was reported; no damage was reported.
EF0	SW of Manter	Stanton	KS	37.4688°N 101.9445°W	2150–2200	0.37 mi (0.60 km)	50 yd (46 m)	A slow-moving landspout tornado caused no damage.
EF0	NE of Monte Vista	Alamosa	CO	37.68°N 106.01°W	2253–2258	0.1 mi (0.16 km)	75 yd (69 m)	A slow-moving landspout tornado remained in an open field; no damage was reported.
EF1	E of Knob Noster to N of Hughesville	Pettis	MO	38.7079°N 93.3886°W	2157 – 2216	14.5 mi (23.3 km)	200 yd (180 m)	This tornado touched down near Knob Noster downing trees, causing roof damage to one house, and causing wall, garage door, window, and roof damage to another house. The tornado moved northeast, downing several trees before reaching a farm, where several structures sustained roof damage and one lost its metal roof and siding. More trees were downed, and two farm equipment sheds were destroyed northeast of the farm. At another farm, parts of the roofs were removed from two buildings. The tornado continued northeast from the second farm and downed a few more trees before dissipating.
EF0	S of Manter	Stanton	KS	37.5055°N 101.88°W	2205–2210	0.27 mi (0.43 km)	50 yd (46 m)	A second landspout tornado formed after the previous one in Stanton County dissipated; no damage was reported.
EF0	S of Stockton	Cedar	MO	37.654°N 93.8301°W	2237 – 2240	3.2 mi (5.1 km)	100 yd (91 m)	A high-end EF0 tornado damaged a barn and several trees.
EF1	Blanket	Brown	TX	31.83°N 98.79°W	2241 – 2255	3.65 mi (5.87 km)	350 yd (320 m)	This tornado moved through Blanket and dissipated south-southeast of town. Two heavy air-conditioning units at Blanket High School were blown off of the roof. It caused roof damage to the gymnasium at the school as well as the nearby bus barn. Trees, power lines, steel fencing, and to tombstones at a cemetery were all knocked down. Some of the trees were oak trees that were more than 100 years old.
EF0	S of Ringgold	Montague	TX	33.798°N 97.931°W	2241–2244	0.92 mi (1.48 km)	50 yd (46 m)	A brief tornado was observed by trained spotters just south of Ringgold. It remained over open land, causing minimal damage.
EF0	NNE of Zephyr	Brown	TX	31.73°N 98.78°W	2300 – 2303	0.2 mi (0.32 km)	50 yd (46 m)	A brief tornado caused no damage.
EF1	NW of Lamar	Barton	MO	37.5204°N 94.4237°W	2303 – 2305	6.81 mi (10.96 km)	100 yd (91 m)	Trees were downed and outbuildings were damaged.
EF2	N of Fairland to NE of Wyandotte	Ottawa	OK	36.8129°N 94.8461°W	2325 – 2340	10 mi (16 km)	800 yd (730 m)	Several homes were damaged, a metal building was severely damaged, and many trees were downed. The tornado occurred simultaneously with the one below.
EF1	NW of Wyandotte, OK to SE of Seneca, MO	Ottawa (OK), Newton (MO)	OK, MO	36.8128°N 94.7701°W	2332 – 2343	9.31 mi (14.98 km)	600 yd (550 m)	This high-end EF1 tornado developed as a twin to the above tornado. Several houses, barns, and outbuildings were damaged. Several trees were downed as well.
EF1	ESE of Proctor	Adair	OK	35.9476°N 94.7581°W	2332 – 2334	2 mi (3.2 km)	150 yd (140 m)	Several trees were downed.
EF1	W of Christie	Adair	OK	35.939°N 94.7271°W	2335 – 2337	2.5 mi (4.0 km)	300 yd (270 m)	Trees were downed and a barn was damaged.
EF1	WSW of Christie, OK to N of Cincinnati, AR	Adair (OK), Washington (AR)	OK, AR	35.9817°N 94.614°W	2340 – 2347	8 mi (13 km)	500 yd (460 m)	Two barns were destroyed, a third barn was damaged, and numerous trees were downed.
EF1	N of Siloam Springs	Benton	AR	36.2001°N 94.5690°W	2349 – 2354	2.9 mi (4.7 km)	500 yd (460 m)	Several homes suffered minor damage and many trees were downed.
EF1	Lehigh	Coal	OK	34.4479°N 96.2849°W	2349 – 2357	5.9 mi (9.5 km)	250 yd (230 m)	Trees and outbuildings were damaged.
EF0	NNW of Collins	St. Clair	MO	37.9375°N 93.636°W	2356 – 2357	0.48 mi (0.77 km)	200 yd (180 m)	A brief tornado downed several trees.
EF1	SE of Prairie Creek	Benton	AR	36.3200°N 93.9296°W	0024 – 0025	0.8 mi (1.3 km)	270 yd (250 m)	A brief tornado embedded in a larger area of straight-line winds in the Beaver Lake area damaged one home and several boat docks. Many trees were downed as well.
EF1	WSW of Hannibal	Marion	MO	39.6938°N 91.4486°W	0024 – 0026	1.16 mi (1.87 km)	50 yd (46 m)	A farm building suffered roof damage and many trees were downed.
EF0	ENE of Priddy	Mills	TX	31.677°N 98.485°W	0025–0027	1.08 mi (1.74 km)	100 yd (91 m)	The Mills County Emergency Manager observed a tornado to the east-northeast of Priddy. It remained over open land, causing minimal damage.
EF1	NE of Shell Knob	Barry, Stone	MO	36.6279°N 93.5845°W	0050 – 0052	1.42 mi (2.29 km)	200 yd (180 m)	Several trees were downed.
EF0	N of Reeds Spring (1st tornado)	Stone	MO	36.7895°N 93.3925°W	0105–0106	1.35 mi (2.17 km)	100 yd (91 m)	A brief tornado downed several trees and tree limbs.
EF1	N of Reeds Spring (2nd tornado)	Stone	MO	36.7755°N 93.3772°W	0105 – 0106	0.58 mi (0.93 km)	100 yd (91 m)	Trees were downed along the path.
EF0	SW of Bokoshe	Le Flore	OK	35.1399°N 94.8763°W	0133–0134	0.7 mi (1.1 km)	260 yd (240 m)	Several trees were downed.
EF1	Cameron	Le Flore	OK	35.0737°N 94.5888°W	0144 – 0155	8.5 mi (13.7 km)	500 yd (460 m)	A home sustained minor roof damage and several trees were downed.
EF0	NW of Gravois Mills	Morgan	MO	38.33°N 92.87°W	0146–0147	0.74 mi (1.19 km)	100 yd (91 m)	Brief tornado uprooted trees and caused minor structural damage.
EF2	Mount Olive	Macoupin	IL	39.072°N 89.7264°W	0314 – 0315	0.2 mi (0.32 km)	75 yd (69 m)	A brief, but strong high-end EF2 tornado moved through the downtown portion of Mount Olive. The second story of a brick building was blown off and several homes, including a historic two-story home, and business had windows blown out and significant roof damage, some of which had their roofs completely ripped off. Three people sustained minor injuries.

=== May 21 event ===
List of confirmed tornadoes – Tuesday, May 21, 2013
EF#	Location	County / Parish	State	Start Coord.	Time (UTC)	Path length	Max width	Summary
EF0	E of Roachdale	Putnam	IN	39.8483°N 86.7255°W	0629 – 0631	1.05 mi (1.69 km)	100 yd (91 m)	A brief tornado damaged a barn and a shed, flipped an irrigation system, and downed several trees.
EF0	WNW of North Salem	Hendricks	IN	39.8734°N 86.6666°W	0634 – 0635	0.13 mi (0.21 km)	30 yd (27 m)	A brief tornado caused damage to a home and a barn and downed several trees.
EF0	S of Midland	Simcoe	ON		1730 – ?	0.35 mi (0.56 km)	55 yd (50 m)	A brief tornado near the community of Elmvale caused minor roof damage to a barn and downed six trees.
EF0	N of Barrie	Simcoe	ON		1800 – ?	2.8 mi (4.5 km)	550 yd (500 m)	A tornado near the community of Dalston damaged a farm silo and downed 50 trees.
EF2	Glenarm	City of Kawartha Lakes	ON		Unknown	Unknown	Unknown	A barn was destroyed, a home lost its roof, and several trees were downed as well.

== See also ==
- Tornadoes of 2013
- Tornado outbreak of May 18–21, 2013
- List of tornadoes in the tornado outbreak of May 26–31, 2013
