= Tornado outbreak of May 18–21, 2013 =

Tornado outbreak that struck the Midwestern United States on May 18–21, 2013

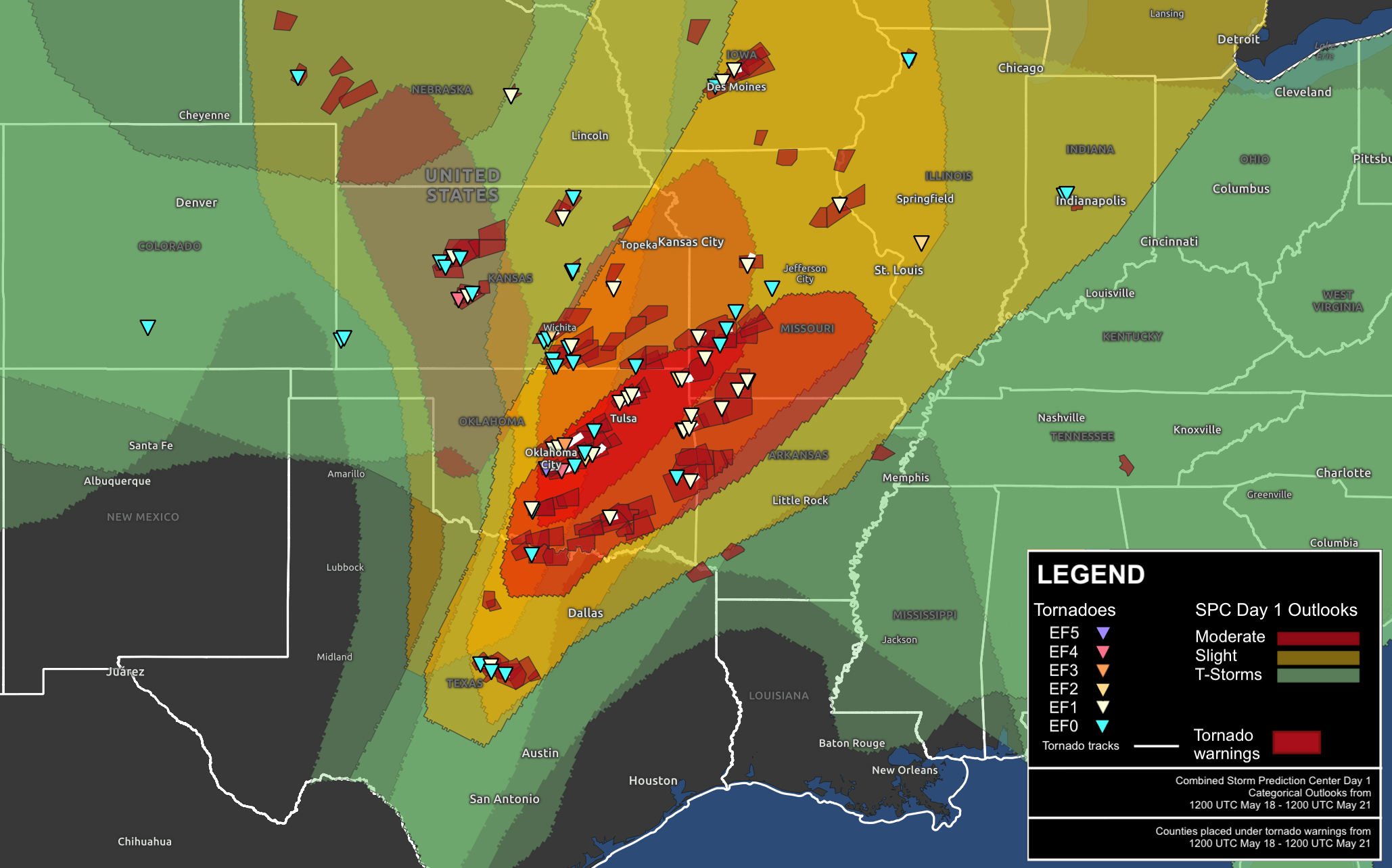
- Map of tornado warnings and confirmed tornadoes from the outbreak (from May 18–21)

Meteorological history
- Duration: May 18–21, 2013

Tornado outbreak
- Tornadoes: 78
- Max. rating: EF5 tornado
- Duration: 2 days, 17 hours, 42 minutes
- Highest winds: Tornadic – 200–210 mph (320–340 km/h) (Moore, Oklahoma EF5 on May 20)
- Highest gusts: Non-tornadic – 100 mph (160 km/h) (Milford Lake, KS on May 18)
- Largest hail: 4.25 in (10.8 cm) (Bigheart, OK on May 20)

Extratropical cyclone
- Lowest pressure: 994 hPa (mbar); 29.35 inHg
- Max. rainfall: 9.5 in (24 cm) in Milton, North Dakota
- Max. snowfall: 13.2 in (34 cm) in Mount Mansfield, Vermont

Overall effects
- Fatalities: 26 fatalities (+3 non-tornadic; +1 indirect)
- Injuries: 229 injuries
- Damage: $2–5 billion (2013 USD) (Note: Includes damages from the May 15 tornadoes in Texas.)
- Areas affected: Central United States (particularly the state of Oklahoma), Canada
- Part of the tornado outbreaks of 2013 and the 2012–13 North American winter

A significant and destructive tornado outbreak affected parts of the Midwestern United States and lower Great Plains in mid-May 2013. This event occurred just days after a deadly outbreak struck Texas and surrounding southern states on May 15. On May 16, a slow moving trough crossed the Rockies and traversed the western Great Plains. Initially, activity was limited to scattered severe storms; however, by May 18, the threat for organized severe thunderstorms and tornadoes greatly increased. A few tornadoes touched down that day in Kansas and Nebraska, including an EF4 tornado near Rozel, Kansas. Maintaining its slow eastward movement, the system produced another round of severe weather nearby. Activity significantly increased on May 19, with tornadoes confirmed in Oklahoma, Kansas, Iowa, Missouri, and Illinois. In Oklahoma, two strong tornadoes, one rated EF4, caused significant damage in rural areas of the eastern Oklahoma City metropolitan area; two people lost their lives near Shawnee. The worst event unfolded on May 20 as a large EF5 tornado devastated parts of Moore, Oklahoma, killing 24 people. Thousands of structures were destroyed, with many being completely flattened. Several other tornadoes occurred during the day in areas further eastward, though the majority were weak and caused little damage.

The severe threat shifted towards damaging straight-line winds on May 21 as a large squall line developed across the southern states. Further north in Ontario, three tornadoes, including an EF2, touched down. Over the following five days, the system responsible for the outbreak moved very little across the Eastern United States. By May 24, it virtually stalled off the coast of New England, resulting in several days of heavy rain across the region. It later moved northeastward and was last noted by the Weather Prediction Center late on May 26 over southeastern Canada. During the storm's eleven-day trek across the United States, it produced 75 tornadoes, 4 of which were rated EF3 or higher. Over 1,000 reports of damaging winds were received by the Storm Prediction Center as well. The system's slow movement also resulted in record-breaking rainfall in North Dakota, New York and Vermont. Additionally, during the overnight of May 25–26, unusually cold air behind the cyclone resulting in record-late snowfall across northern New England.

Overall, severe weather associated with the storm was responsible for 30 fatalities (26 from tornadoes) and over 200 injuries in the United States. Additionally, damage was estimated to amount to $2–5 billion, making it one of the costliest severe weather events on record.

== Meteorological synopsis ==
The cause of the outbreak was a large, slow-moving trough, an associated cold front, and several shortwave troughs that triggered severe weather from the Rockies eastward to New England and from Canada southward to the Gulf Coast of the United States. The system impacted the United States and Canada from May 16–26 and produced tornadoes on five of the eleven days. During this nearly two-week-long event, the Storm Prediction Center (SPC) received 1,967 reports of severe weather: 101 for tornadoes, 1,176 for wind, and 690 for hail. Some of these reports were associated with a separate system over the Southeastern United States on May 19–20.

The first indications of a possible tornado outbreak came on May 13 as weather forecast models began depicting a multi-day severe weather event across the Central United States. On May 16, a shortwave trough, along with a surface front emerged from the Rockies into the High Plains. Only scattered thunderstorms accompanied the system, with few reaching severe levels. Only 13 reports of large hail and damaging winds in Colorado, Kansas, and Nebraska, were received by the SPC. On May 17, a slow-moving mid- to upper-level trough in the same region brought a further risk of thunderstorms. Significant low-level moisture streamed northward from Texas into the Dakotas ahead of the system. This increased dew points in the area into the 50 °F (10 °C) range; orographic lift and up-slope flow was expected to trigger the development of storms. The SPC issued a small slight risk for severe thunderstorms around the Black Hills into central Nebraska, with the main threat being large hail and the possibility of an isolated tornado. A second slight risk area was issued over central Texas as the northward flow collided with a dry line in the area. Though there was notable atmospheric capping, convective available potential energy (CAPE) values of 2,500–3,000 J/kg led to the potential of localized supercells capable of producing very large hail and downbursts. Additionally, a stationary outflow boundary over southern Minnesota and northern Iowa encountered moderate instability and produced scattered severe storms, some of which were capable of producing tornadoes. Two tornadoes were confirmed in Young County, Texas: one EF1 and one EF0 (these tornadoes were only partially associated with the main system). Throughout the day, the SPC received a total of 103 reports of severe weather in association with the system: 10 for tornadoes, 21 for wind, and 86 for hail. The tornadoes were not fully associated with the main system.

=== May 18 ===
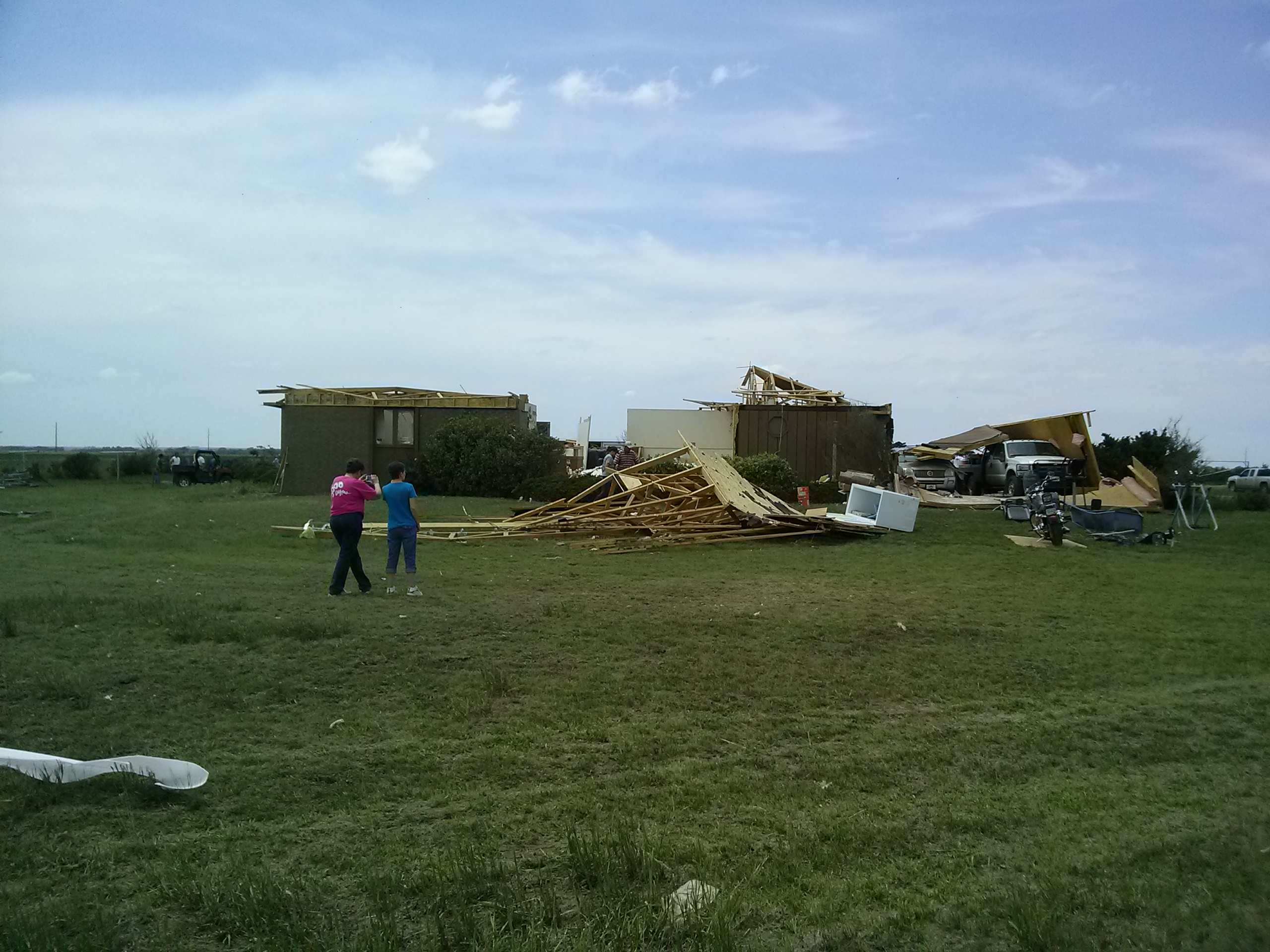
Damage caused by an EF4 tornado near Rozel, Kansas on May 18.

On May 17, the SPC issued a moderate risk of severe weather for northwestern Kansas and southwestern Nebraska for the following day. This was later extended southward into western Oklahoma. On May 18, the trough continued to slowly move from the Rockies into the Great Plains region. Extreme instability ahead of it, with CAPE values reaching 4,000–5,000 J/kg along with strong diabatic heating, was anticipated to spark widespread severe thunderstorms and some supercells. The main threat on May 18 was large hail and straight-line winds, with a lesser concern for tornadoes. The first tornado watch was issued at 2:45 p.m. CDT (1945 UTC) for much of western Nebraska, Kansas, and extreme northeast Colorado as moist northerly flow ahead of the trough met up with a dry line moving into the region. Tornadic activity was expected to be relatively limited at first, though a strengthening low-level jet along with increasing relative humidity along the boundary layer would provide more favorable conditions for development.

During the evening of May 18, tornadoes touched down in parts of Kansas and Nebraska. However, most remained in open country, causing little damage. Around 5:30 p.m. CDT (2230 UTC), a supercell thunderstorm developed to the northeast of Dodge City. At 7:18 p.m. CDT (0018 UTC), it spawned a large EF4 tornado near Rozel, Kansas; one home was largely destroyed and five farms were damaged. Around the time it reached EF4 intensity, the tornado took a sharp northward turn as it passed within 1 mile (1.6 km) of Rozel. Aaron Johnson of the National Weather Service in Dodge City stated that had it not made the turn, Rozel would have likely been destroyed. A second tornado briefly touched down around 7:50 p.m. CDT (0050 UTC). By 8:30 p.m. CDT (0130 UTC), a squall line began developing over south-central Nebraska and central Kansas. Several corridors of intense winds, possibly associated with brief tornadoes, were observed in Clay and Washington counties in Kansas. Several homes were damaged or destroyed by the winds. Near Milford Lake, a non-tornadic gust of 100 mph (160 km/h) was measured; two people were injured near the lake after their camper tipped over. Later on, strong southerly flow and isentropic lift intersected a stationary front over northern South Dakota, southern North Dakota, and western Minnesota, allowing for scattered severe storms to develop. One of these storms produced gusts up to 85 mph (137 km/h) to the east of Okreek, South Dakota. Throughout the day, the SPC received a total of 231 reports of severe weather: 24 for tornadoes, 92 for wind, and 115 for hail.

=== May 19 ===
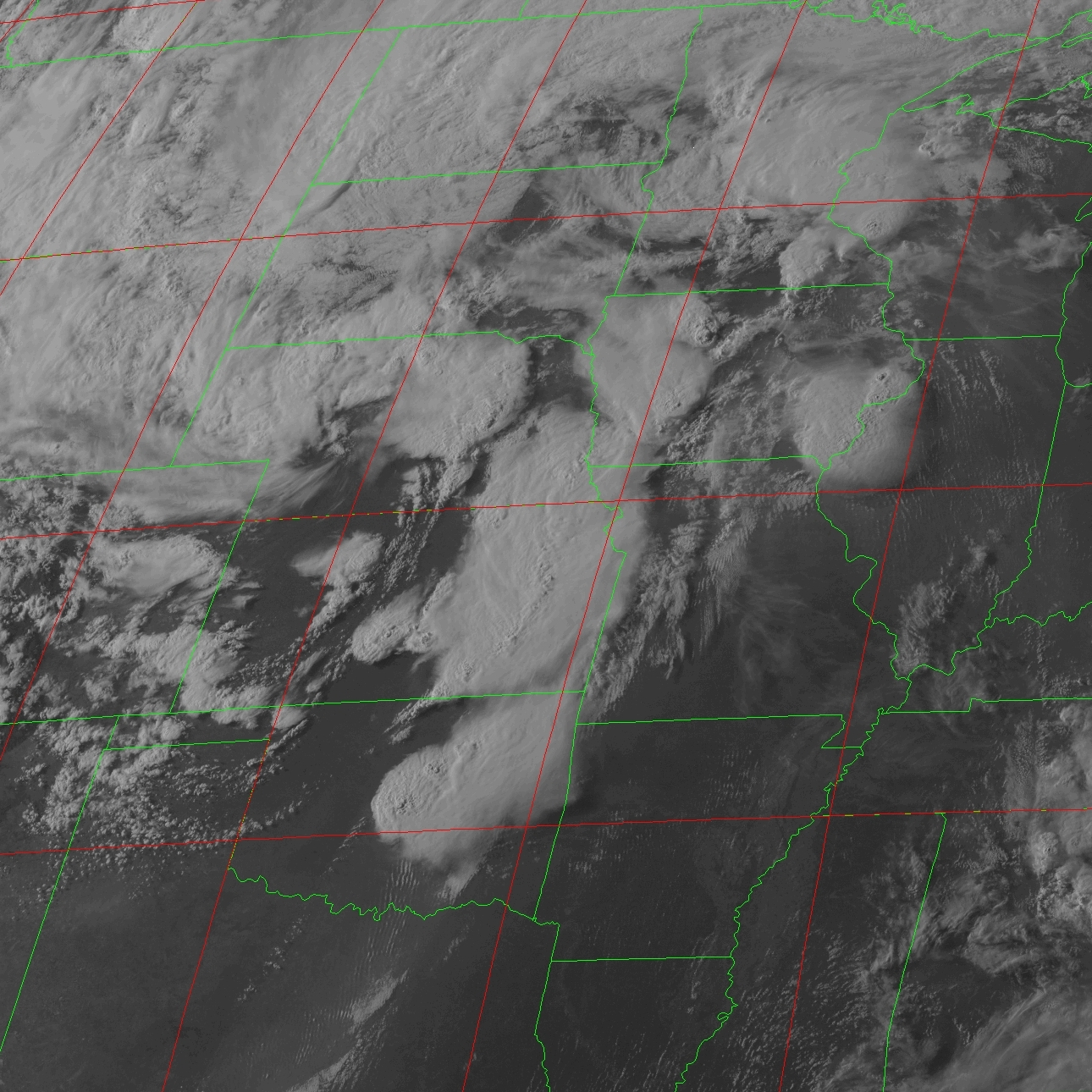
Visible satellite imagery of the severe thunderstorms at 6:10 p.m. CDT on May 19.

On May 19, the trough moved only slightly eastward, with many of the same areas impacted on May 18 being threatened again. During the day, two areas of low pressure developed along the trough: one over the north-central plains and the other over Oklahoma. A large plume of steep mid-level lapse rates accompanied by deep moisture (with dew points in some areas exceeding 70 °F (21 °C)) spread across much of the central and southern plains into the Mississippi River Valley. Thunderstorms in these areas were expected to develop early, though not be particularly widespread or damaging. The most intense storms were anticipated over the southern Missouri River Valley where strong daytime heating and "aggressive destabilization" would take place. Additionally, a diurnally strong jet and strong wind shear favored the development of long-lived supercells capable of producing large hail and tornadoes, some potentially violent. Activity was expected to become associated with a squall line by the evening as the cold front moved slowly eastward. In light of that, the SPC issued a moderate risk of severe thunderstorms for south-central Oklahoma, eastern Kansas, western Missouri, and extreme southeastern Nebraska.

By the afternoon hours, rapid destabilization of the boundary layer began across eastern Kansas, prompting a tornado watch for the area. Further south in Oklahoma, a rapidly mixing dry line accompanied by a deepening surface low moved eastward into an area with deep moisture. Though leftover outflow boundaries from the previous day's storms and capping limited initial convective activity, strong daytime heating would soon allow storms to break the cap. A tornado watch was issued for the central third of Oklahoma at 2:15 p.m. CDT (1915 UTC), with the SPC noting the risk for potentially long-lived supercells and a few strong tornadoes. Around 2:30 p.m. CDT (1930 UTC), a supercell developed over Harper County, Kansas and tracked northeastward. This cell produced three short-lived tornadoes, including an EF2 to the southwest of Wichita that prompted a tornado emergency for the city. Over the course of three hours, 10 other tornadoes touched down across the state, none of which exceeded EF1 intensity.

By 4:30 p.m. CDT (2130 UTC), the risk for significant tornadoes markedly increased over central Oklahoma, especially around the Oklahoma City metropolitan area. Maximized pressure falls ahead of the dry line allowed several storms to acquire intense updrafts and develop into rotating supercells within the state. Very strong low-level mesocyclones were expected to develop with these storms, with several tornadoes touching down. Around this time, tornadoes began touching down around the city. At 4:41 p.m. CDT (2141 UTC), a large EF3 tornado developed 3 mi (4.8 km) northwest of Luther and tracked for roughly 20 mi (32 km). To the southeast, a violent EF4 tornado formed around 6:00 p.m. CDT (2300 UTC) over Cleveland County. That storm was the strongest of the day and resulted in significant damage, especially near the city of Shawnee where two people were killed. Two other tornadoes touched down during the evening in eastern Oklahoma: one EF2 and one EF1. In addition to the two fatalities, 39 people were injured across the state.

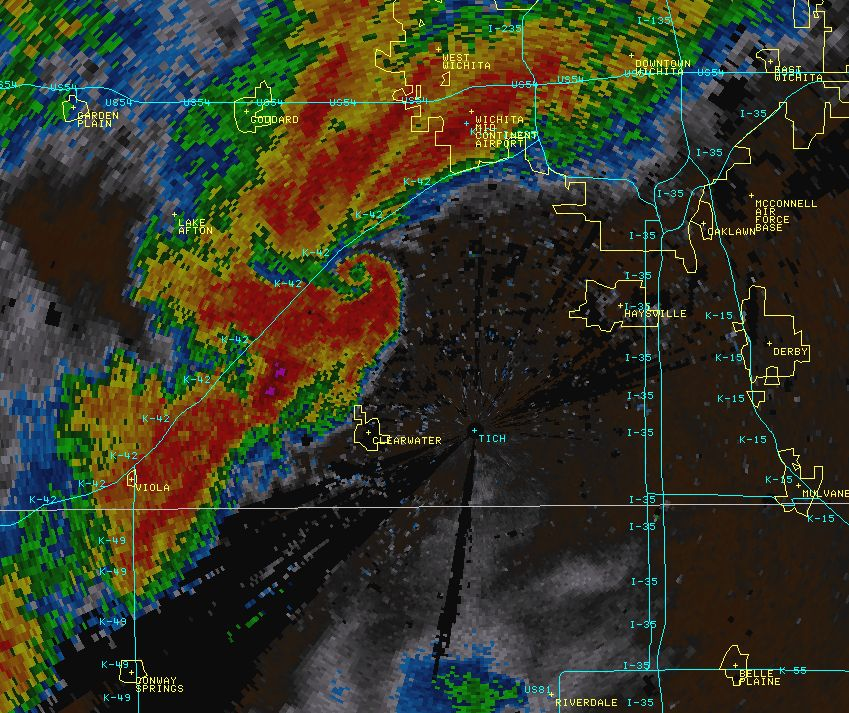
Radar image of a supercell thunderstorm to the southwest of Wichita, Kansas at 3:32 p.m. CDT (2032 UTC) that spawned an EF2 tornado.

Storm coverage over eastern Kansas soon increased as well, with the main threat being damaging winds. Further north over parts of Iowa and Minnesota, a mid-level vortex over the region accompanied by scattered thunderstorms presented a risk of severe storms. Increasing wind shear and an influx of moist air from the south was expected to allow convection to persist over the region for much of the evening, with the main threat being damaging winds and a few tornadoes. By the evening hours, several squall lines developed across the region. Unstable air over much of Missouri allowed for these storms to maintain themselves as they moved slowly eastward. Around 7:00 p.m. CDT (0000 UTC), a rapidly moving vorticity maximum over Iowa resulted in a significant increase in thunderstorms over the area, some of which were tornadic. The most intense cell tracked from Dallas County to Story County, producing three brief tornadoes and straight-line winds along its path. The touchdowns in Iowa marked the end of a record 358-day span with no tornadoes in the state.

Severe activity began decreasing by 10:00 p.m. CDT (0300 UTC) as the main squall line over Missouri entered an area of increased capping. A secondary line, extending northward into Wisconsin, behind it with bowing segments, indicative of locally intense winds, produced additional damaging winds, though it gradually weakened during the overnight of May 19–20. Throughout the day, the SPC received a total of 558 reports of severe weather: 34 for tornadoes, 325 for wind, and 199 for hail; however, some of the wind and hail reports were associated with a separate system over the Southeastern United States.

=== May 20 ===
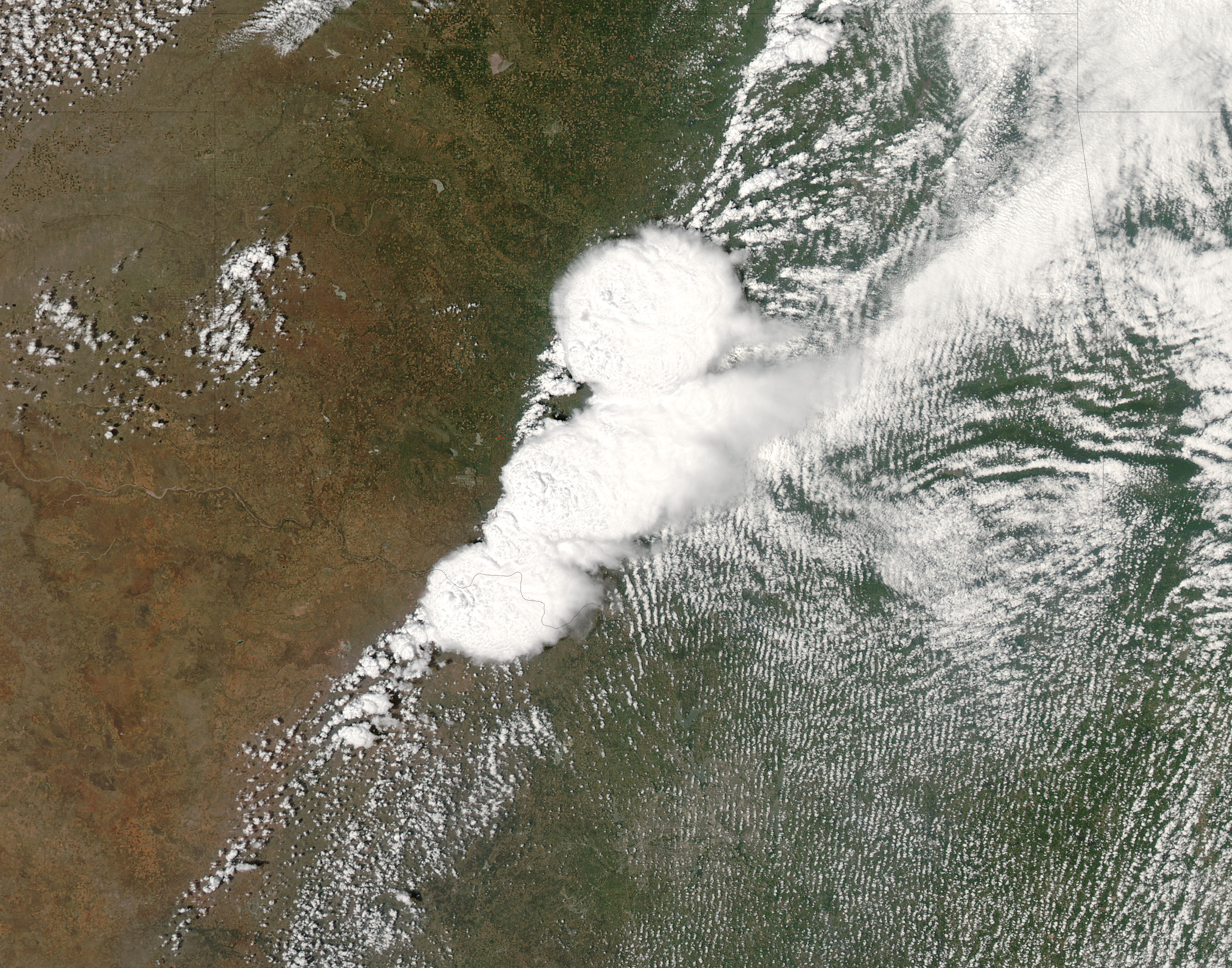
Multiple supercells associated with the storm system as seen on May 20 at 2:40 p.m. CDT (1940 UTC)

On May 20, a prominent central upper trough moved eastward with a lead upper low pivoting over the Dakotas and Upper Midwest. A Southern stream shortwave trough/moderately strong polar jet moved east-northeastward over the southern Rockies to the southern Great Plains and Ozarks area, with severe thunderstorms likely with peak heating. The Storm Prediction Center issued a moderate risk of severe thunderstorms during the early morning hours of May 20 from southeastern Missouri to north-central Texas, for the possibility of isolated strong tornadoes across central and eastern Oklahoma, in addition to the threat of large hail and damaging straight-line wind gusts.

The most catastrophic event of the day occurred when a violent EF5 tornado struck Moore, Oklahoma, damaging or destroying more than 13,000 homes and killing 25 people including seven children who died while taking shelter inside Plaza Towers Elementary School, which was flattened by the tornado. The tornado shared some similarities to the F5 tornado in the same area on May 3, 1999.

In Michigan, gusts from the squall line reached 80 mph (130 km/h), downing numerous trees and power lines. Some trees were 1.5 feet (0.46 m) in diameter. A few trucks were blown onto their sides as well. Roughly 30,000 customers of Consumers Energy lost power across the state. Further south, considerable damage took place across Missouri and Arkansas due to a squall line. Gusts reached 88 mph (142 km/h) in Hannibal, Missouri. One person was killed in Springdale, Arkansas after his vehicle was struck by wind-driven debris. Several tornadoes touched down within this squall line in the two states, none of which exceeded EF1 intensity. The squall line continued to produce damaging winds as it progressed eastward into Illinois and Indiana. Three additional tornadoes touched down into the early hours of May 21, including a brief EF2 in Mount Olive, Illinois around 10:14 p.m. CDT (0314 UTC).

Throughout the day, the SPC received a total of 447 reports of severe weather: 37 for tornadoes, 281 for wind, and 129 for hail; however, some of the wind and hail reports were associated with a separate system over the Southeastern United States.

=== May 21 ===
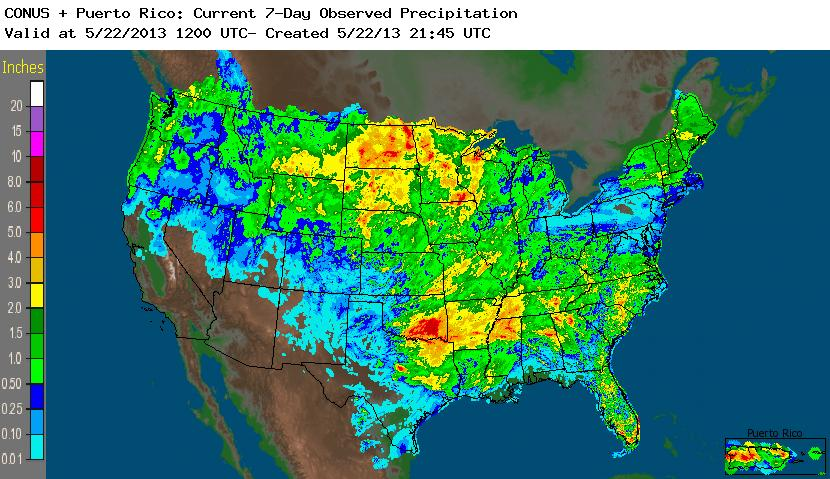
Total precipitation across the United States from May 16–22.

Similar to the preceding days, the slow moving trough and associated cold front moved slowly eastward on May 21. Strong instability ahead of the system prompted the SPC to issue a moderate risk of severe thunderstorms for extreme southeast Oklahoma, southwest Arkansas, northwest Louisiana, and northeast Texas; however, the main threat was damaging winds rather than tornadoes. With CAPE values of 2,500–4,000 J/kg and 50 to 65 mph (80 to 105 km/h) shear across the region, conditions were once again favorable for the development of supercells capable of producing large hail. Activity was expected to be scattered at first, with some isolated supercells capable of producing tornadoes, but a squall line was anticipated to develop quickly and become the dominant feature. In the Northeast and Great Lakes region, southwesterly flow ahead of the trough brought warm, moist air into the area. Moderate instability, with CAPE values ranging from 1,000 to 2,000 J/kg and steep lapse rates were supporting of damaging straight-line winds, especially across Michigan, New York and Massachusetts. Later on, instability increased in the Northeast along a quasi-stationary front, leading to the risk of isolated supercells and a mesoscale convective system.

During the morning of May 21, a strong shortwave trough over the Texas Panhandle moved eastward into Oklahoma. Moderate instability in the region led to the formation of thunderstorms across the state, with strong thunderstorms developing near the Oklahoma City metropolitan area, including the city of Moore.

Ahead of the main line of storms, a loosely organized squall line formed over central Tennessee by 11:15 a.m. CDT (1615 UTC). Initiating along the edge of an old outflow boundary, the system moved into an area with CAPE values of 2,000–3,000 J/kg and strong daytime heating. As it moved east-northeastward, it became increasingly intense and organized. Widespread wind damage occurred from central Tennessee into eastern Kentucky. The highest winds associated with this line reached 77 mph (124 km/h). Numerous trees and power lines were downed across both states. One person was injured in Wilson County, Tennessee after a construction crane was blown over onto a car by high winds.

Severe storms extended into Ontario, Canada, where a squall line produced some damage. Strong winds downed many trees and power lines, leaving roughly 3,000 people without power. Heavy rains also caused some flooding, leaving cars stranded. Three tornadoes touched down across the province: one EF2 near Glenarm and two EF0s. In New York, two microbursts, both with winds up to 70 mph (110 km/h), caused minor damage in Cayuga and Seneca counties. Further south, a tornado warning was issued for Columbia and Dutchess Counties after a trained spotter mistakenly reported a tornado on the ground near the town Copake; it was later discovered that the spotter was looking at scud clouds rather than a funnel or a tornado. The outbreak ended at that point.

Throughout May 21, the SPC received a total of 413 reports of severe weather: none for tornadoes, 307 for wind, and 106 for hail.

== Confirmed tornadoes ==
Confirmed tornadoes by Enhanced Fujita rating
EFU	EF0	EF1	EF2	EF3	EF4	EF5	Total
0	37	32	5	1	2	1	78

=== Lake Thunderbird–Bethel Acres–Shawnee, Oklahoma ===
Lake Thunderbird–Bethel Acres–Shawnee, Oklahoma
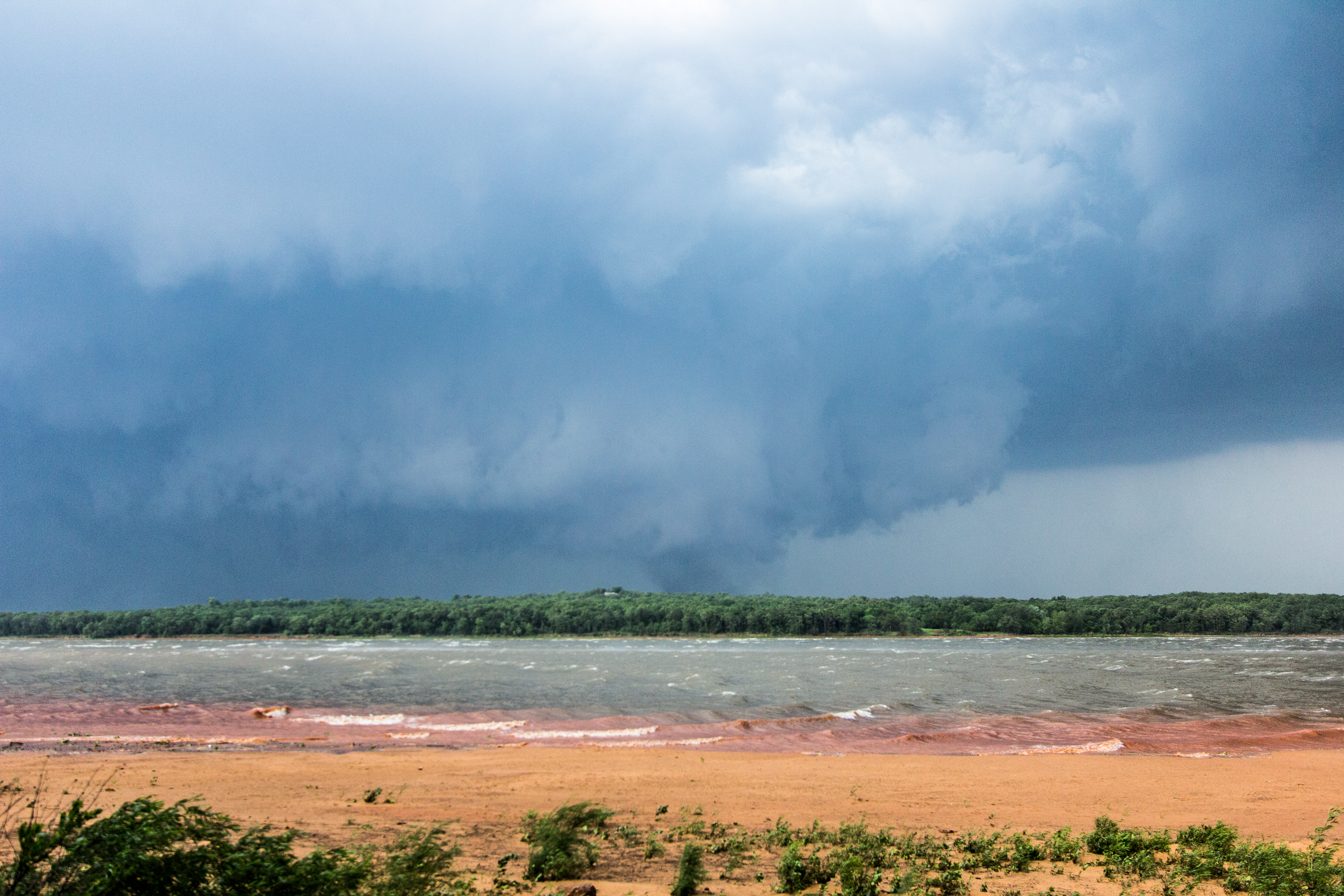
- A photo of the tornado taken from Lake Thunderbird

Meteorological history
- Formed: May 19, 2013, 6:00 p.m. CDT (UTC−05:00)
- Dissipated: May 19, 2013, 6:50 p.m. CDT (UTC−05:00)
- Duration: 50 minutes

EF4 tornado
- on the Enhanced Fujita scale
- Highest winds: 175 mph (282 km/h)

Overall effects
- Fatalities: 2
- Injuries: 10

At 6:00 p.m. CDT (2300 UTC) on May 19, this large and powerful EF4 tornado touched down along the western shore of Lake Thunderbird in eastern Cleveland County (east of Norman). Initially, the tornado was weak, damaging roofs and trees (though a metal building was destroyed at EF2 intensity in this area). The tornado intensified as it crossed Lake Thunderbird, destroying a mobile home and tearing the roofs off of two frame homes as it reached the eastern shore of the lake. Further northeast, the tornado intensified further to EF3 strength as it tore through several nearby subdivisions, heavily damaging or destroying numerous homes and mobile homes, and toppling several metal high-tension truss towers. The tornado widened and weakened back to EF2 strength as it crossed S Harrah Rd, completely destroying several mobile homes and outbuildings in that area. The tornado maintained EF2 strength as it passed directly over the Shawnee Reservoir, destroying numerous mobile homes and tearing roofs off of frame homes along the shore. The tornado regained EF3 intensity as it passed northwest of Bethel Acres, and a mobile home park sustained a direct hit from the tornado in this area, with 30–35 mobile homes completely destroyed. There, one person was killed and six others were injured, two critically. A frame home near the mobile home park was left with only interior rooms standing.

Past the mobile home park, the large stovepipe tornado intensified further into a violent EF4. A permanent home in this area was swept completely away with only the slab foundation remaining and much of the debris blown to the northeast. Several trees were denuded and debarked in this area, one of which was found with a truck wrapped around it. The tornado continued across a nearby open field, leaving behind a pronounced swath of ground scouring. The tornado then weakened back to EF2 strength as it crossed I-40 at exit 181 (US 177) at the northwest edge of Shawnee. There, a tractor-trailer was blown off an overpass (falling 20 feet (6.1 m)) and destroyed, while two other trucks were knocked over on their sides. The driver of the first truck sustained minor injuries. Several smaller vehicles were impacted as well, resulting in a fatality and several injuries. The incident shut down U.S. 177 and westbound lanes of Interstate 40 in the area; U.S. 177 reopened the following morning, while traffic on the interstate was restricted to one lane. A mobile home and several outbuildings were destroyed in this area, and a permanent home had its roof torn off. Turning sharply to the north, a final brief area of EF3 damage was noted as a home was left with only interior walls standing, and several other nearby homes were damaged to a lesser degree. Further to the northeast, the tornado tore the roof off of a house and destroyed two outbuildings at EF2 strength. The tornado later dissipated at 6:50 p.m. CDT (2350 UTC) about 6.5 miles (10.5 km) southeast of McLoud, after causing some additional minor tree damage along Coker Rd.

During its 50-minute track, the tornado attained EF4 intensity and remained on the ground for approximately 20 miles (32 km). Debris from the tornado was reported to have fallen in Bristow, Depew and Tulsa.

=== Newcastle–Moore, Oklahoma ===
Newcastle–Moore, Oklahoma
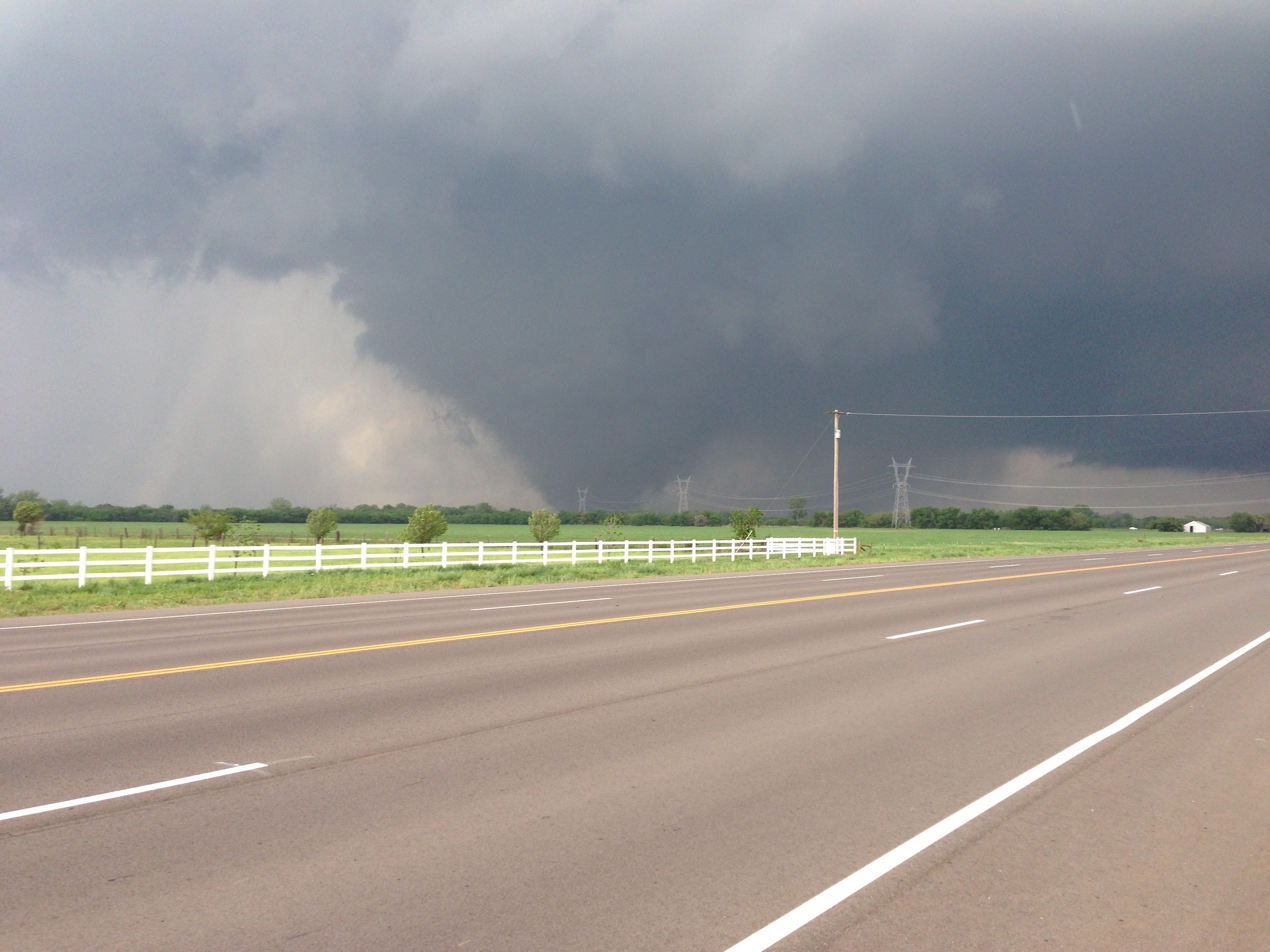
- A view of the tornado passing through southern Oklahoma City.

Meteorological history
- Formed: May 20, 2013, 2:56 p.m. CDT (UTC−05:00)
- Dissipated: May 20, 2013, 3:35 p.m. CDT (UTC−05:00)
- Duration: 39 minutes

EF5 tornado
- on the Enhanced Fujita scale
- Highest winds: 200–210 mph (320–340 km/h)

Overall effects
- Fatalities: 24
- Injuries: 212
- Damage: $2 billion (2013 USD)

During the early afternoon of May 20, severe thunderstorms quickly developed across much of central Oklahoma. At 2:40 p.m. CDT (1940 UTC), a tornado warning was issued for a storm approaching the Oklahoma City metropolitan area. Sixteen minutes later, this catastrophic and extremely powerful tornado touched down roughly 3 miles (4.8 km) northwest of the center of Newcastle in McClain County. Tracking northeast, the system rapidly intensified, attaining EF4 intensity within seconds of touching down. After crossing the I-44 bridge over the Canadian River, the tornado turned east and tracked directly through South Oklahoma City and Moore, producing a large swath of catastrophic damage through densely populated areas. Numerous homes sustained EF4 damage in Moore, and a few scattered instances of EF5 damage were also noted, especially near I-35/US 77. Based on multiple instances of well-built, anchor-bolted brick homes being completely swept away in Moore, along with the presence of severe ground scouring, wind-rowing of structural debris, and large multi-ton objects being lofted long distances through the air, it was estimated that the tornado had peak winds of 200–210 mph (320–340 km/h). The storm abruptly dissipated at 3:35 p.m. CDT (2035 UTC) about 4.8 miles (7.7 km) east of Moore.

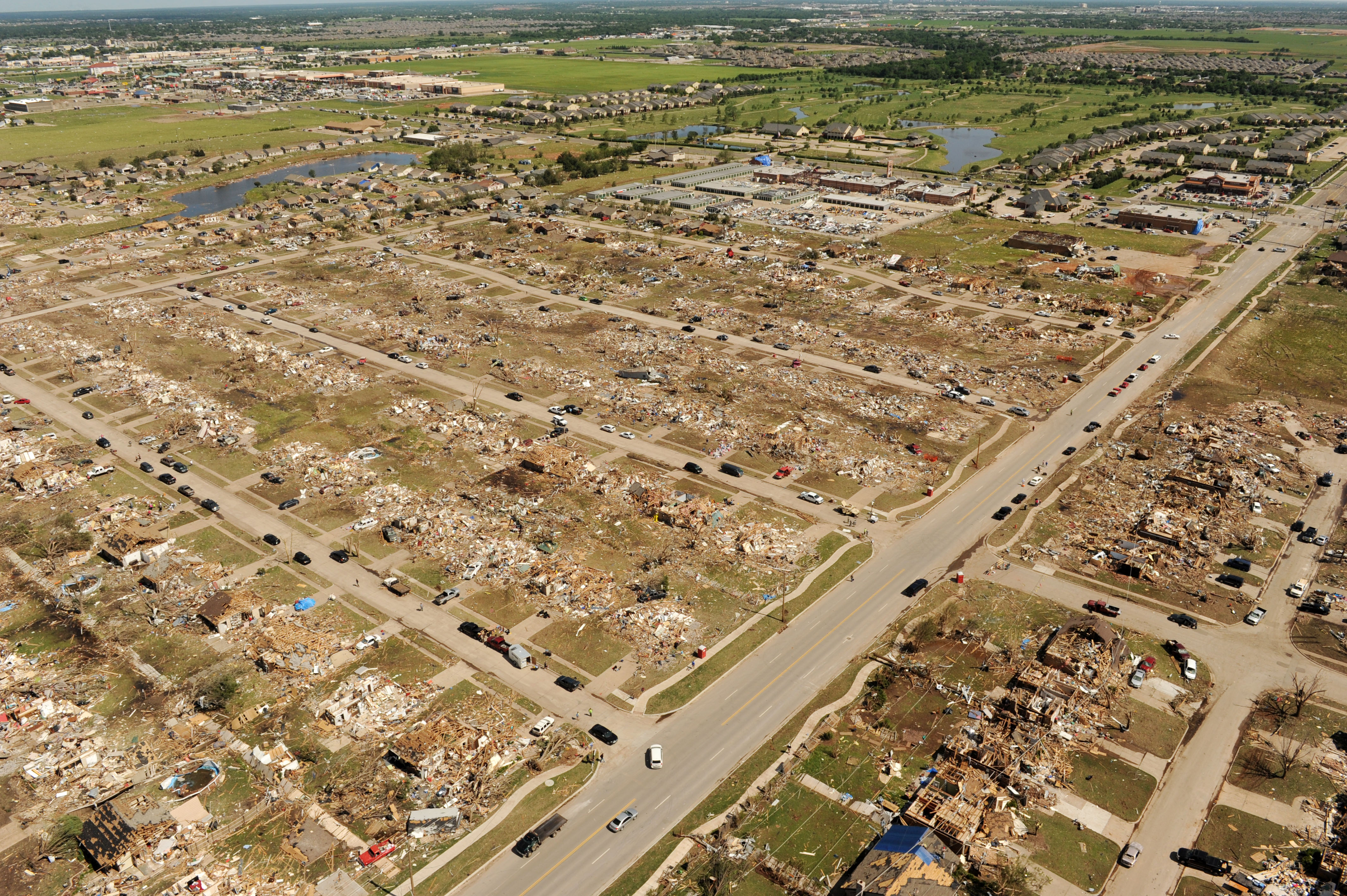
Aerial view of catastrophic damage to the Plaza Towers neighborhood in Moore.

Taking a path through the heart of Moore, an estimated 13,500 people were directly affected by the tornado. Large swaths of the city were completely destroyed and unofficial estimates placed the number of severely damaged or destroyed buildings at 1,500 with another 4,000 affected. In contrast to the violent nature of the tornado, the death toll was relatively low. A total of 24 people lost their lives, nine of whom were children, and over 200 were injured. This ranks it as the ninth-deadliest tornado in the state's history. The lack of further fatalities was attributed to a 16-minute lead time on the Moore tornado given by the National Weather Service forecast office in Norman. Risk Management Solutions Inc. estimated that the insurance payout from the tornado would amount to $2–3.5 billion, stating that the event was worse than the 1999 Bridge Creek–Moore tornado and may rival the 2011 Joplin tornado.

== Non-tornadic events ==
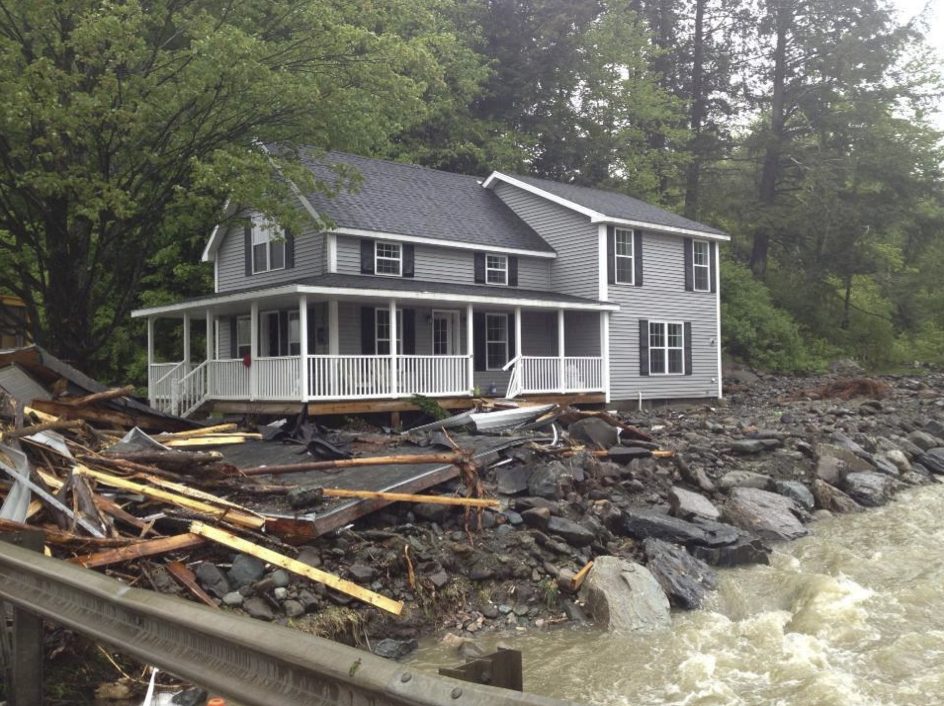
Damage from flash flooding in Jericho, Vermont on May 23.

Alongside the destructive tornadoes, prolonged heavy rains affected much of the Southern and Central United States. The heaviest rains fell across parts of North Dakota, with accumulations amounting to 9.5 inches (240 mm) near Milton in Cavalier County over a three-day span. On May 19, many areas in the state recorded daily record rains with Bismarck receiving 1.45 in (37 mm), surpassing the record set in 1877. On May 21, concerns arose that the Renwick Dam along the Tongue River could collapse. Roughly 1,300 people in the town of Cavalier were urged to evacuate. Highway 18 and Highway 5 in the area were closed due to flooding. In nearby Crystal, half of the town was flooded despite efforts to protect it with 8,000 sandbags. With fears of the dam collapse in North Dakota, the National Guard was deployed to Cavalier in order to construct emergency levees. Early on May 23, the water level at the dam began receding and fears of it collapsing subsided.

Similarly heavy, though not as extreme, rains fell in Minnesota. There, accumulations peaked near Osage in Becker County at 4.55 in (116 mm). On May 22, a landslide at Lilydale Regional Park killed two children and injured two others on a field trip. Elsewhere in the country, heavy rain events lead to numerous instances of localized flash flooding. Notable flooding occurred in the New York City metropolitan area, Memphis, Tennessee, and Southaven, Mississippi. The latter of these areas declared a state of emergency as a result of the storms. Further northeast, record rains triggered damaging floods in Vermont. Many areas received over 3 in (76 mm) of rain, with a maximum of 6.79 in (172 mm) falling in Jeffersonville. Several homes were damaged, one beyond repair, roads were washed out, and bridges were damaged. Several culverts, already known to be inadequate following flooding from Tropical Storm Irene in 2011, were overwhelmed. Damage in Underhill was estimated at $1.7–2.3 million.

Between May 25 and 26, unusually late snowfall impacted parts of Vermont, New Hampshire and Ontario. Most accumulations were limited to higher elevations; however, in parts of New Hampshire, snow levels fell to 500 ft (150 m) in altitude. Notable measurements in the state included 4 in (10 cm) in Jefferson and 2 in (5.1 cm) in Alexandria. These accumulations tied the record-latest snowfall date in New Hampshire of May 26, 1967. Snowfall was expected to reach 6 in (15 cm) in the eastern townships of Ontario. The combination of heavy rains and snow in Vermont led to significant power outages in the state, with Green Mountain Power reporting approximately 12,100 residences without electricity. Some areas in the state received over 6 in (15 cm) of snow, with a maximum of 13.2 in (34 cm) falling on Mount Mansfield. This marked the latest 12 in (30 cm) snowfall on record for the area. Record-late snows also occurred in Syracuse and Binghamton, New York. Unofficial reports from Whiteface Mountain in the Adirondacks indicated as much as 34 in (86 cm) of snow.

== Aftermath ==
Casualties by State
State	Total	Fatalities	Injuries
Arkansas	1	1	0
Illinois	3	0	3
Kansas	2	0	2
Minnesota	4	2	2
New York	1	0	1
Oklahoma	405	26	377
Tennessee	1	0	1
West Virginia	2	0	2
Totals	419	29	390
Totals are inclusive of all events related to the overall system.

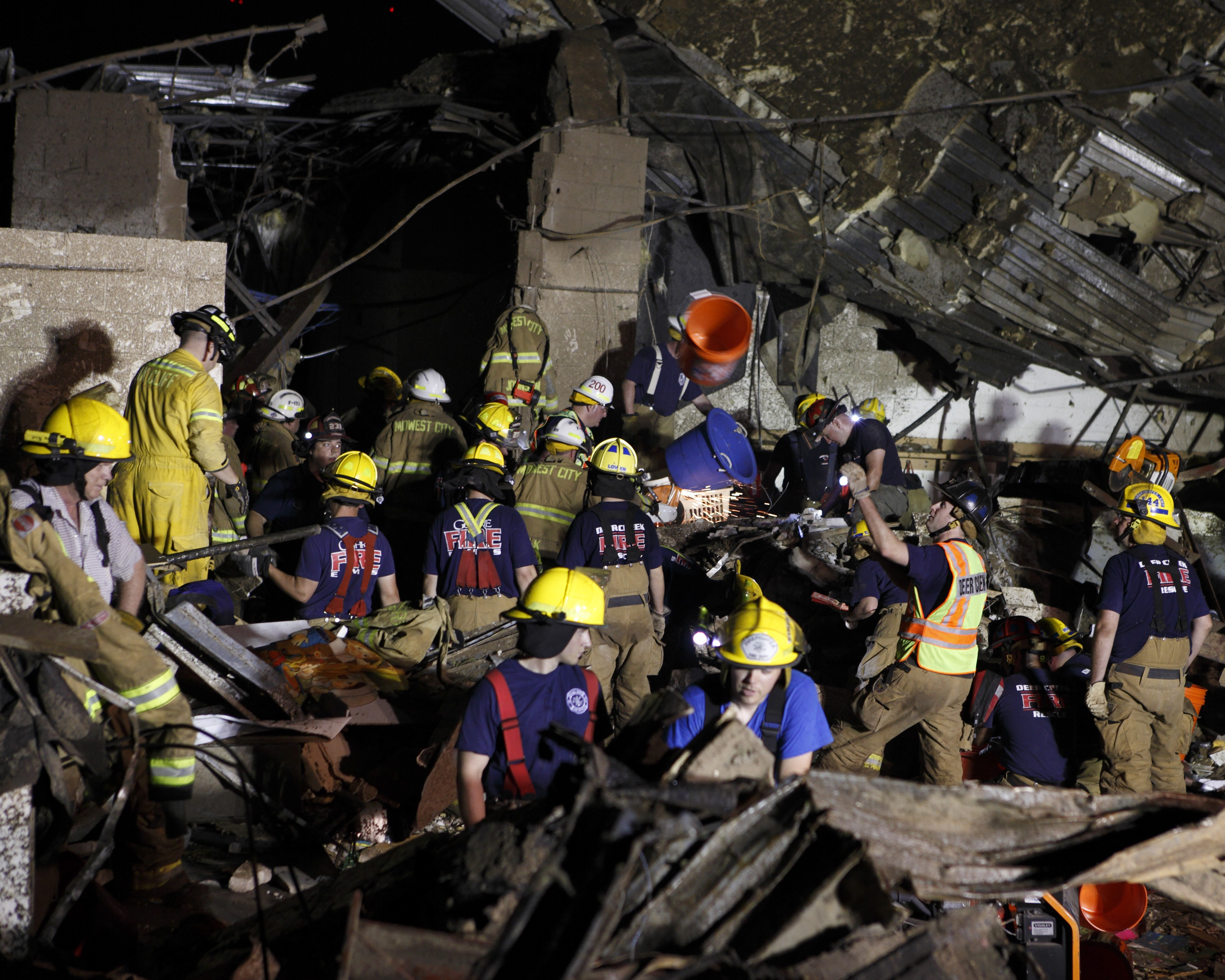
Search and rescue operations took place throughout Moore, Oklahoma in the wake of the tornado.

Immediately following the May 19 tornadoes, the Red Cross set up emergency shelters in Carney and Shawnee to house those left homeless. On May 20, Oklahoma governor Mary Fallin declared a state of emergency for 16 counties. The following day, President Barack Obama signed a major disaster declaration for Cleveland, Lincoln, McClain, Oklahoma and Pottawatomie counties. This allowed for federal aid to be sent to residents in the hardest-hit areas of Oklahoma and gain access to temporary housing, home repairs, and low-cost loans. Non-governmental donations to the state reached $24 million on May 27, with $15 million coming from the Red Cross. Chesapeake Energy also provided oil-drilling equipment to be used for debris removal. The previous disaster declaration was later expanded to include areas affected by another destructive severe weather event that occurred just over a week later. Federal and state aid to Oklahoma reached $7.6 million on June 15, with more than 10,000 households applying for assistance.

In Shawnee, the Southern Baptist Disaster Relief, the Salvation Army, and Red Cross provided free meals to first responders and displaced residents. The Federal Emergency Management Agency (FEMA) set up two disaster centers: one in Shawnee and the other in Moore. In the wake of the Moore tornado, there were rumors that relief organizations were relocated from communities in Shawnee; however, the Salvation Army and local news agencies confirmed that residents in the area were getting proper assistance.

On May 24, Vermont Governor Peter Shumlin requested that FEMA assess the damage from floods to see if the state qualified for disaster aid. Following the assessments, Chittenden, Essex, and Lamoille Counties were declared major disaster areas on June 13, allowed residents to receive federal aid.

== See also ==
- List of North American tornadoes and tornado outbreaks
- 1999 Great Plains tornado outbreak – an outbreak that also produced a very destructive tornado in similar areas
- Tornado outbreak of May 26–31, 2013 – a similar outbreak that occurred a few days later
