= Bethel, Oklahoma =

Bethel may refer to the following places in the U.S. state of Oklahoma:

- Bethel, Comanche County, Oklahoma, an unincorporated community
- Bethel, McCurtain County, Oklahoma, a rural unincorporated community
- Bethel Acres, Oklahoma, a town in Pottawatomie County
