= Bethel, Pennsylvania =

Bethel, Pennsylvania may refer to:

- Bethel Park, Pennsylvania
- Bethel, Berks County, Pennsylvania
- Bethel, Cambria County, Pennsylvania
- Bethel, Mercer County, Pennsylvania
- Bethel, Sullivan County, Pennsylvania
- Bethel, Wayne County, Pennsylvania

== See also ==
- Bethel Township, Pennsylvania (disambiguation)
- Mount Bethel, Pennsylvania
