= Bethel (surname) =

Bethel is a surname. Notable people with the surname include:

- Ashton Bethel-Roman (born 2005), American football player
- Judy Bethel (1943–2025), former member of the Canadian House of Commons
- Lorraine Bethel, African American lesbian feminist poet and author
- McLeod Bethel-Thompson (born 1988), American quarterback
- Nicolette Bethel, Director of Culture in the Bahamas
- Paulette Bethel, Ambassador/Permanent Representative of the Bahamas to the United Nations
- Pepsi Bethel (1918–2002), American jazz dancer and choreographer
- Wilson Bethel (born 1984), American actor, best known from Hart of Dixie

== See also ==
- Bethell, a surname
