= Bethel, Oregon =

Bethel may refer to the following in the U.S. state of Oregon:

- Bethel, Eugene, Oregon, a neighborhood in Eugene
- Bethel, Polk County, Oregon, an unincorporated community
- Bethel Elementary School, in the Salem-Keizer School District, named after the Bethel Church, built in that locale by the Dunkard Brethren

== See also ==
- Bethel (disambiguation)
- Bethel School District (Oregon), in the Bethel neighborhood of Eugene
