= Bethell =

Bethell is an English surname, from a medieval diminutive of the personal name Beth, which in turn is derived from Elizabeth. It can also be a Welsh surname, from the given name Ithael. It has variations Bithell and Bythell. Notable people with the surname include:

- Alexander Bethell (1855–1932), Royal Navy officer who went on to be Commander-in-Chief, Plymouth
- Anna Bethell (1882–1969), English actress, singer and stage director
- Bob Bethell (1942–2012), Republican member of the Kansas House of Representatives, representing the 113th district
- Christopher Bethell (1773–1859), Bishop of Bangor
- Ernest Bethell (1872–1909), British journalist who worked in Korea under Japanese rule
- George Bethell (1849–1919), Royal Navy officer and Conservative politician
- Hugh Bethell (died 1679) (1615–1679), English politician who sat in the House of Commons from 1660 to 1679
- Jacob Bethell (born 2003) English cricketer
- John Bethell, 1st Baron Bethell (1861–1945), British banker and Liberal politician
- James Bethell, 5th Baron Bethell (born 1967), British Conservative politician
- Keppel Bethell, Major-General in the First World War
- Lauran Bethell (21st century), American Baptist missionary
- Leonard Arthur Bethell (1879–1950), Lieutenant Colonel in Gurkha regiments in North East India, author, member of the Younghusband expedition to Tibet, 1904
- Leslie Bethell (born 1937), English historian, university professor, and Brazilianist
- Marie Bethell Beauclerc (1845–1897), pioneer in the teaching of Pitman's shorthand and typing in Birmingham, England
- Nicholas Bethell, 4th Baron Bethell (1938–2007), British historian of Central and Eastern Europe
- Ray Bethell, professional kite flyer in Vancouver, Canada
- Richard Bethell, 1st Baron Westbury (1800–1873), Lord Chancellor of Great Britain
- Richard Bethell (1772–1864), British Tory and then Conservative Party politician from Rise, Yorkshire
- Roy Bethell (1906–1976), English footballer
- Tabrett Bethell (born c. 1982), Australian model and actress
- Tom Bethell (1936–2021), journalist who writes mainly on economic and scientific issues
- Tony Bethell (1922–2004), RAF pilot and participant in the "Great Escape"
- Ursula Bethell (1874–1945), New Zealand poet
- Ursula Bethell, Baroness Westbury (1924–2023), British peeress and superintendent-in-chief of St John Ambulance
- Zachary Bethell (died 1635), royal servant

== See also ==
- Te Henga (Bethells Beach), New Zealand
- Bethells Bridge, swing bridge across the Driffield Navigation in Yorkshire, England
- Bethell's Island, Bermuda
- Bethel (disambiguation)
- Vernon v Bethell (1762), English property law case
