= Bethel School =

Bethel School may refer to:

- Bethel School (Monticello, Florida), in Jefferson County, listed on the National Register of Historic Places (NRHP)
- Bethel School (Lincolnville, Kansas), in Marion County, NRHP-listed in Marion County

== See also ==
- Bethel Christian School (disambiguation)
- Bethel High School (disambiguation)
- Bethel (disambiguation)
