= Temple Beth El (Syracuse, New York) =

- Location of the former synagogue in New York

Religion
- Affiliation: Orthodox Judaism (1965 – 2002); Conservative Judaism (2002 – 2007)
- Ecclesiastical or organizational status: Former synagogue
- Status: Closed and sold

Location
- Location: 3528 East Genesee Street, Syracuse, New York
- Country: United States
- Interactive map of Temple Beth El
- Coordinates: 43°02′30″N 76°05′22″W

Temple Beth El was a synagogue located at 3528 East Genesee Street, Syracuse, New York. It was designed by Nicholas Goffredo, a local architect.

== History ==
Founded in 1965 as an Orthodox congregation, the congregation was initially affiliated with the Orthodox Union. In c. 1997, the congregation joined the Union for Traditional Judaism.

Later, in 2002, it changed to a Conservative affiliation, and held its final service on January 27, 2007.

In 2007, due to declining membership, the synagogue has closed and was sold. The membership voted to join Congregation Beth Sholom-Chevra Shas, a Conservative synagogue at 18 Patsy Lane in DeWitt. In October 2007, the Slavic Full Gospel Church began using the building.

=== 2000 arson attack ===
The temple building, but not the sanctuary, was heavily damaged in an arson attack on October 13, 2000. Palestinian-American Ramsi Uthman was convicted in the attack. Uthman, who was born in Venezuela to Palestinian parents, is a naturalized U.S. citizen. Ahed Shehadeh was convicted of aiding and abetting the arson. According to Shehadeh's testimony, after Uthman set fire to the Temple, he yelled "I did this for you, God!"

In exchange for his testimony Shehadeh received a five-year prison sentence, and was released in 2008. Uthman received the maximum possible sentence of 25 years, to be served in New York's Attica Correctional Facility, although he will be eligible for parole in 2021. He was convicted of a hate crime.

The building reopened in 2001 after repairing some $700,000 of damage from the attack.
