= Bethel Township =

Bethel Township may refer to:

- Bethel Township, McDonough County, Illinois
- Bethel Township, Posey County, Indiana
- Bethel Township, Fayette County, Iowa
- Bethel Township, Michigan
- Bethel Township, Clark County, Ohio
- Bethel Township, Miami County, Ohio
- Bethel Township, Monroe County, Ohio
- Bethel Township, Armstrong County, Pennsylvania
- Bethel Township, Berks County, Pennsylvania
- Bethel Township, Delaware County, Pennsylvania
- Bethel Township, Fulton County, Pennsylvania
- Bethel Township, Lebanon County, Pennsylvania
