= Ray Bethell =

Canadian kite flier (1928–2018)

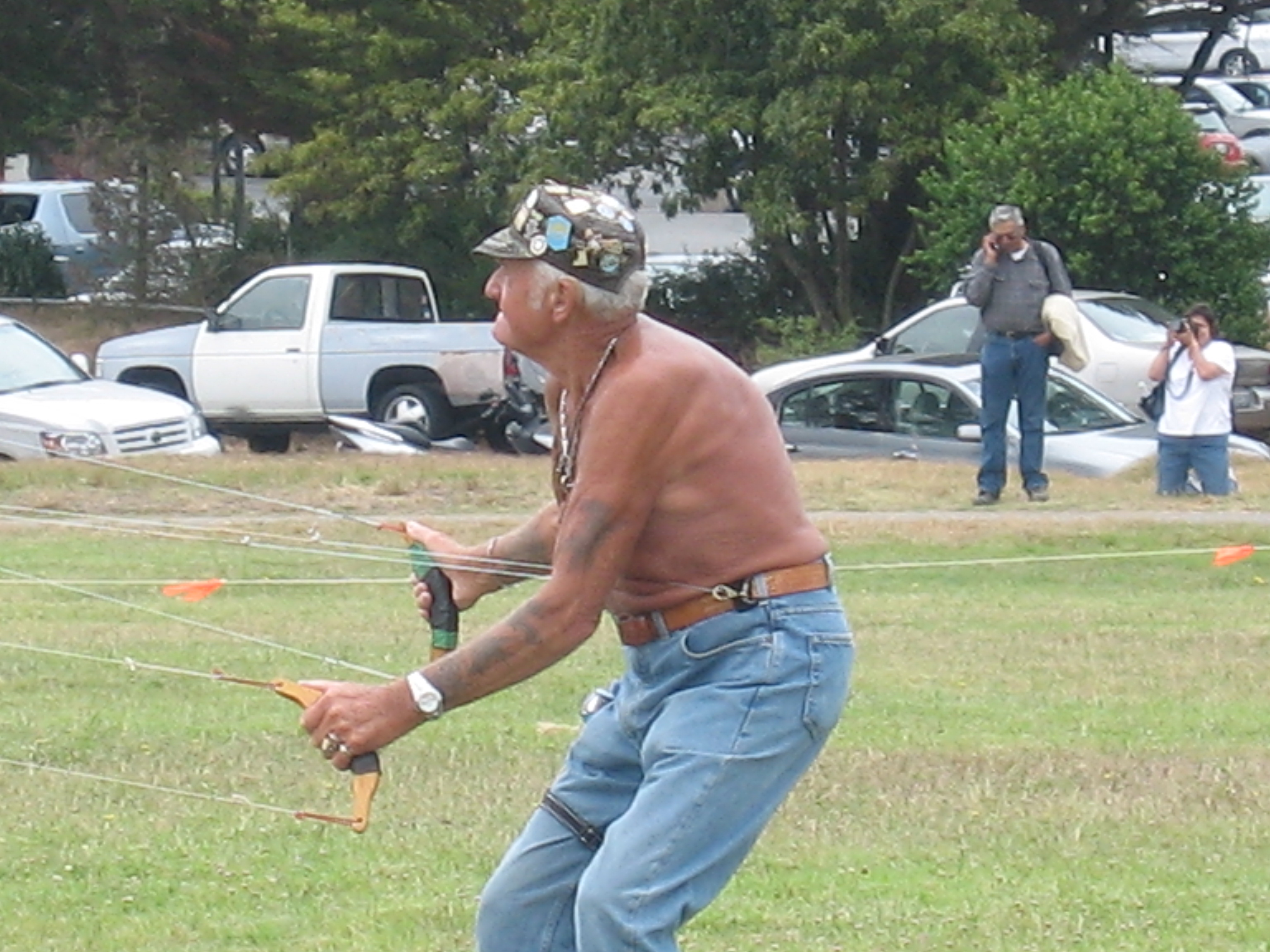
Ray Bethell flying three kites at the 2006 Berkeley Kite Festival.

Ray Bethell (March 1, 1928 - December 18, 2018) was a professional kite flyer who resided in Vancouver, British Columbia, Canada. He holds multiple endurance world records related to simultaneously flying three stunt kites, one from each hand and one from his hips. Using the same technique he can fly multiple stacks of kites (up to 39 kites in total). Bethell has travelled extensively since 1991 displaying his prowess at International Kite Festivals.

He was the subject of a documentary short film by Matt Nie of the Vancouver Film School, "Good Stuff", which won first place at the 2005 TriBeCa Film Festival in New York City.

In October 2006, a commemorative bench was unveiled at Ray's home flying spot, Vanier Park in Vancouver, British Columbia, Canada. This project was initiated by Michelle Welsford and Gary Mark of Toronto and an international campaign to raise funds for this bench began in January, 2006.
