= Richard Bithell =

English agnostic philosopher and writer

- Born: 22 March 1821; Lewes, Sussex, UK
- Died: 4 December 1902 (aged 81)
- Occupations: Philosopher, writer

Richard Bithell (22 March 1821 – 4 December 1902) was an English agnostic philosopher and writer.

Bithell was born at Lewes, Sussex on 22 March 1821. When he was 11, he worked at his father's smithy in Lewes. Due to ill health he later took up teaching. He took courses at the Borough Road Training College to become a teacher of chemistry and mathematics. In 1843, he was appointed master of the British School in Chesterfield. He was transferred to Brighton, Wolverton and London.

Bithell obtained a BSc from London University and a PhD from University of Göttingen. He developed an interest in philosophy and authored a series of books on agnosticism. From 1865 he worked at the banking house of the Rothschilds until his retirement in 1898. His title-pages describe him as "B.Sc., Ph.D., Fellow of the Institute of Bankers". Bithell was a member of the Rationalist Press Association.

Bithell has been cited as one of the early popularizers of agnosticism during the late 19th century.

== Selected publications ==
- A Counting-House Dictionary, containing an explanation of the technical terms used by merchants and bankers, etc. (1882; new ed., 1903)
- The Creed of a Modern Agnostic (1883)
- Agnostic Problems (1887)
- A Handbook of Scientific Agnosticism (1892)
