= Bert Bithell =

English footballer

Personal information
- Full name: Samuel Herbert Bithell
- Date of birth: 19 November 1900
- Place of birth: Hindley, England
- Date of death: 18 October 1969 (aged 68)
- Place of death: Southport, England
- Height: 5 ft 9 1/2 in (1.77 m)
- Positions: Inside left; outside forward

Senior career*
Years	Team	Apps	(Gls)
- St Philip's Old Boys
- Crossens
- Burscough Rangers
1922–1923	Southport	5	(0)
1923	Burnley	0	(0)
1927	High Park		
- * Club domestic league appearances and goals

Samuel Herbert Bithell (19 November 1900 – 18 October 1969) was an English professional footballer who played in the Football League for Southport as a forward.

== Career statistics ==
Appearances and goals by club, season and competition
Club	Season	League			FA Cup		Total	
Club	Season	Division	Apps	Goals	Apps	Goals	Apps	Goals
Southport	1921–22	Third Division North	2	0	0	0	2	0
Southport	1922–23	Third Division North	3	0	0	0	3	0
Career total			5	0	0	0	5	0

== Honours ==
Burscough Rangers

- Rall-Walker Cup: 1921–22
