= Bethel Christian School (Pennsylvania) =

School in Pennsylvania, United States

Coordinates: 42.08698°N 80.10627°W

Location
- 1781 W 38th St; Erie, Erie County, Pennsylvania; United States

Information
- Established: 1973; 53 years ago
- NCES School ID: 01199614
- Teaching staff: 14.1 FTE
- Grades: K-12
- Gender: Mixed
- Enrollment: 144 (2021-2022)
  - Kindergarten: 18
  - Grade 1: 18
  - Grade 2: 14
  - Grade 3: 10
  - Grade 4: 9
  - Grade 5: 14
  - Grade 6: 11
  - Grade 7: 10
  - Grade 8: 11
  - Grade 9: 11
  - Grade 10: 7
  - Grade 11: 3
  - Grade 12: 8
- Student to teacher ratio: 10.2:1

Bethel Christian School is a PreK-12 Christian school in Erie, Pennsylvania.

The school was established in 1973.
