= Temple Beth-El (Anniston, Alabama) =

Historic Reform synagogue in Anniston, Alabama, US

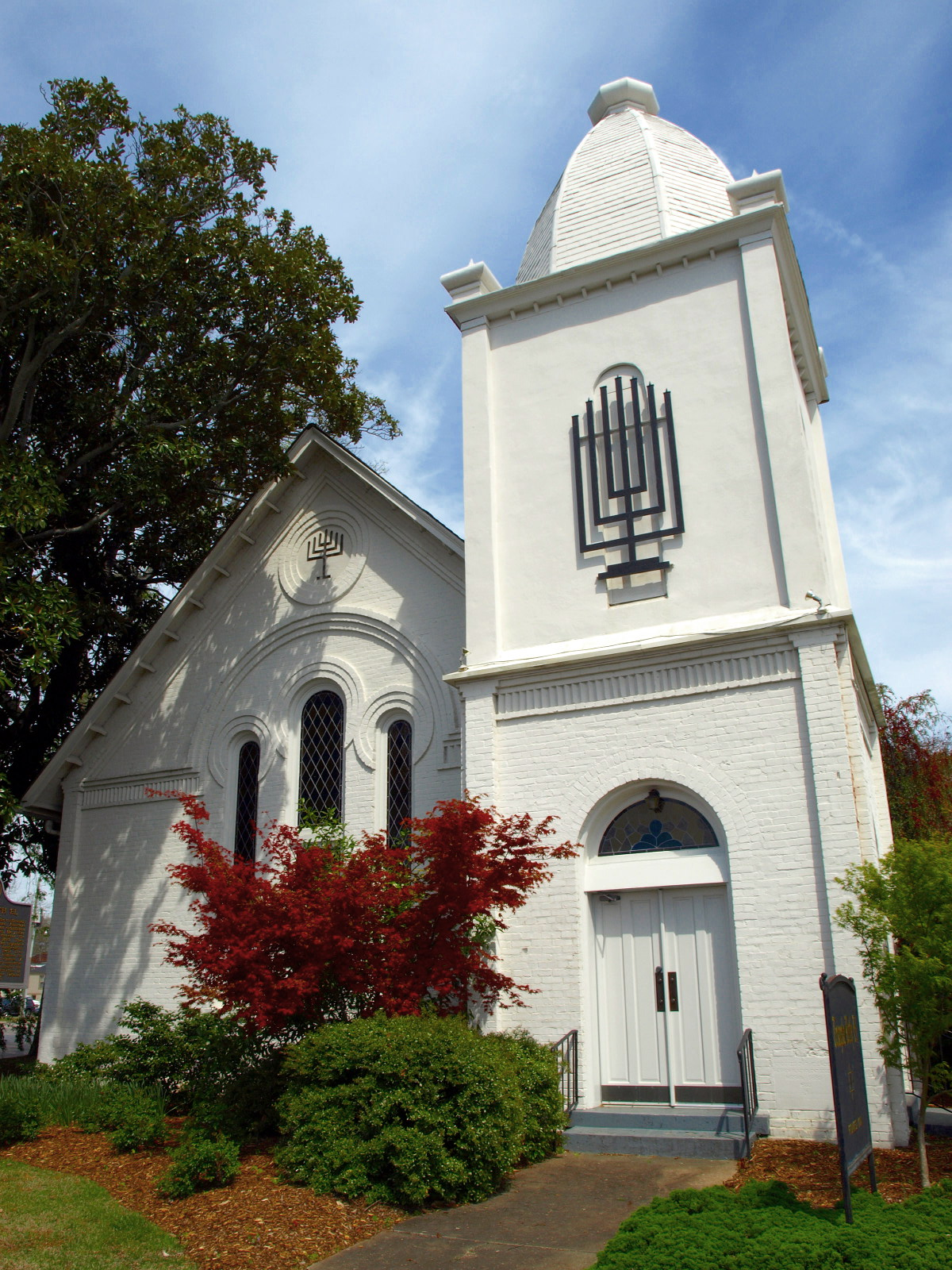
- The synagogue building, in 2014

- Location in Alabama

Religion
- Affiliation: Reform Judaism
- Ecclesiastical or organizational status: Synagogue
- Leadership: Rabbi Lauren Cohn
- Status: Active

Location
- Location: 301 East Thirteenth Street, (Note: Congregation website lists address as 1301 Quintard Avenue) Anniston, Alabama 36201
- Country: United States
- Interactive map of Temple Beth-El
- Coordinates: 33°39′40″N 85°49′33″W

Architecture
- Type: Synagogue architecture
- Style: Romanesque Revival; Vernacular Romanesque
- Established: 1888 (as a congregation)
- Completed: 1891

Website
- beth-el.bridgesite.org
- Temple Beth-El
- U.S. National Register of Historic Places
- Area: less than one acre
- MPS: Anniston MRA
- NRHP reference No.: 85002887
- Added to NRHP: October 3, 1985

Temple Beth-El is a historic Reform Jewish congregation and synagogue, located at 301 East Thirteenth Street, in Anniston, Alabama, United States. The synagogue was built in 1891 in the Romanesque Revival style.

The synagogue was added to the National Register of Historic Places on October 3, 1985.

Established as a congregation in 1888, and supported by the Ladies Hebrew Benevolent Society that was established in 1890, the congregation completed the building in 1891 and, by 1893, was dedicated as free of debt.

As of November 2018, the rabbi was Lauren Cohn, appointed earlier that year.
