= Beth El Synagogue (Newfoundland) =

- Main entrance, with Star of David glazing

Religion
- Affiliation: Conservative Judaism
- Leadership: President: Michael Paul
- Status: Active

Location
- Location: 124 Elizabeth Ave, St. John's, Newfoundland and Labrador, Canada
- Interactive map of Beth El Synagogue
- Coordinates: 47°34′48″N 52°43′03″W

Architecture
- Completed: 1961

Beth El Synagogue is a Conservative synagogue in St. John's, Newfoundland and Labrador. It is the only synagogue in Newfoundland, and the easternmost synagogue in North America.

The Hebrew Congregation of Newfoundland was founded in 1909 as an Orthodox congregation meeting in rented spaces in town. The earliest members were Jews from the United States; later, many Russian Jews who had defected from the Soviet Union became members during the Cold War. The current synagogue building at the corner of Elizabeth and Downing was constructed from 1959 to 1961, and features include an open courtyard. Edmond de Rothschild was made an honorary member of the synagogue in 1966 for his contributions to its construction. In 2001, the building underwent extensive renovations.

As of 2008, the congregation had 25 member families. The president was Dr. Michael Paul.
