= Bethel Township, Pennsylvania =

Bethel Township is the name of some places in the U.S. state of Pennsylvania:

- Bethel Township, Armstrong County, Pennsylvania
- Bethel Township, Berks County, Pennsylvania
- Bethel Township, Delaware County, Pennsylvania
- Bethel Township, Fulton County, Pennsylvania
- Bethel Township, Lebanon County, Pennsylvania

== See also ==
- Lower Mount Bethel Township, Pennsylvania
- Upper Mount Bethel Township, Pennsylvania
