= Beth El Jewish Center of Flatbush =

Orthodox synagogue in Brooklyn, New York

Congregation Beth El of Flatbush
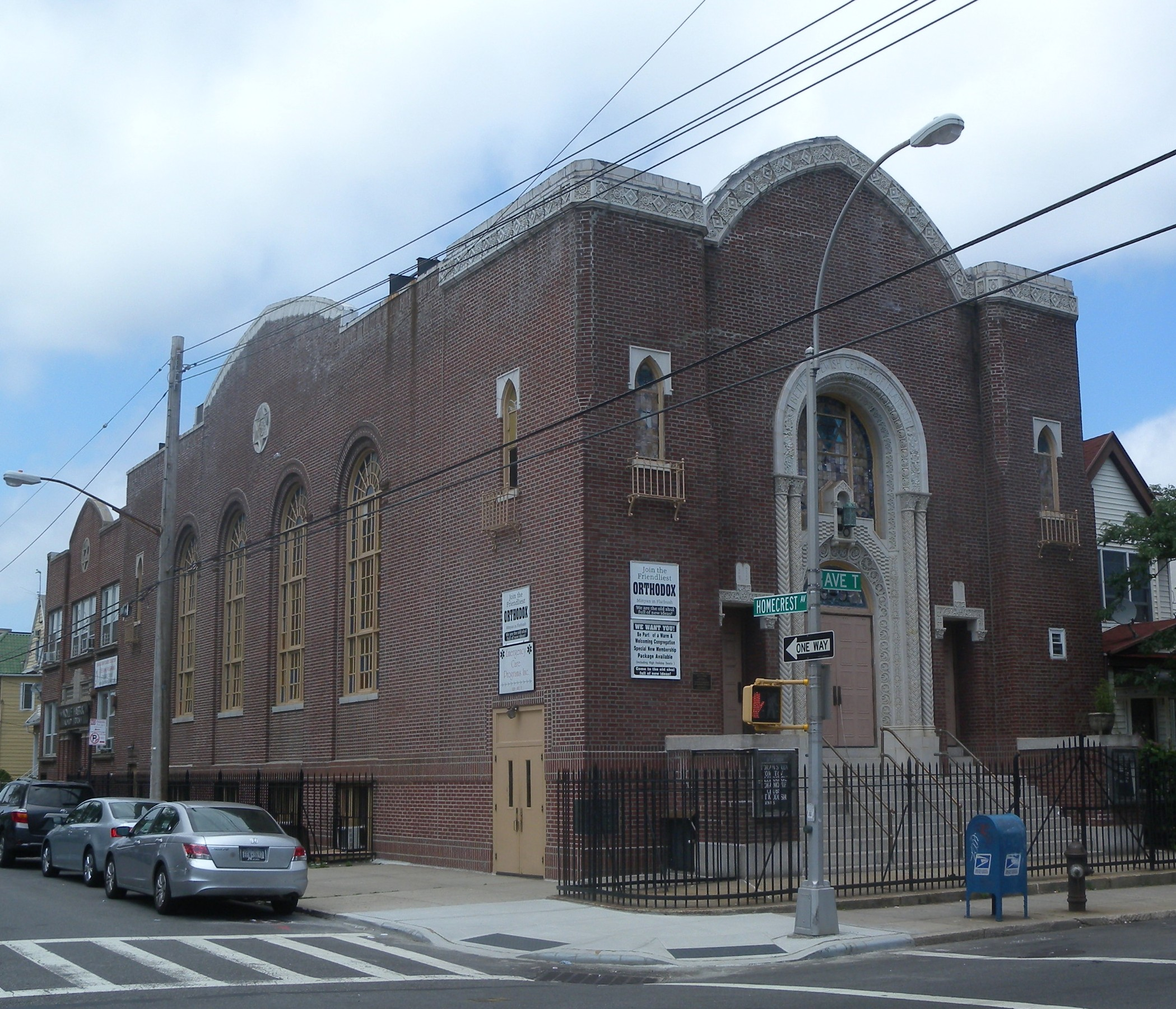

- Location in New York City

Religion
- Affiliation: Orthodox Judaism
- Rite: Sephardic
- Ecclesiastical or organisational status: Synagogue
- Leadership: Rabbi David Ani
- Status: Active

Location
- Location: 2181 East 3rd Street, Brooklyn, New York City, New York 11223
- Country: United States
- Coordinates: 40°35′49″N 73°58′06″W

Architecture
- Architects: Seelig & Finkelstein
- Type: Synagogue architecture
- Style: Byzantine Revival; Gothic Revival
- Completed: 1927

Website
- bethelofflatbush.com
- Beth El Jewish Center of Flatbush
- U.S. National Register of Historic Places
- New York State Register of Historic Places
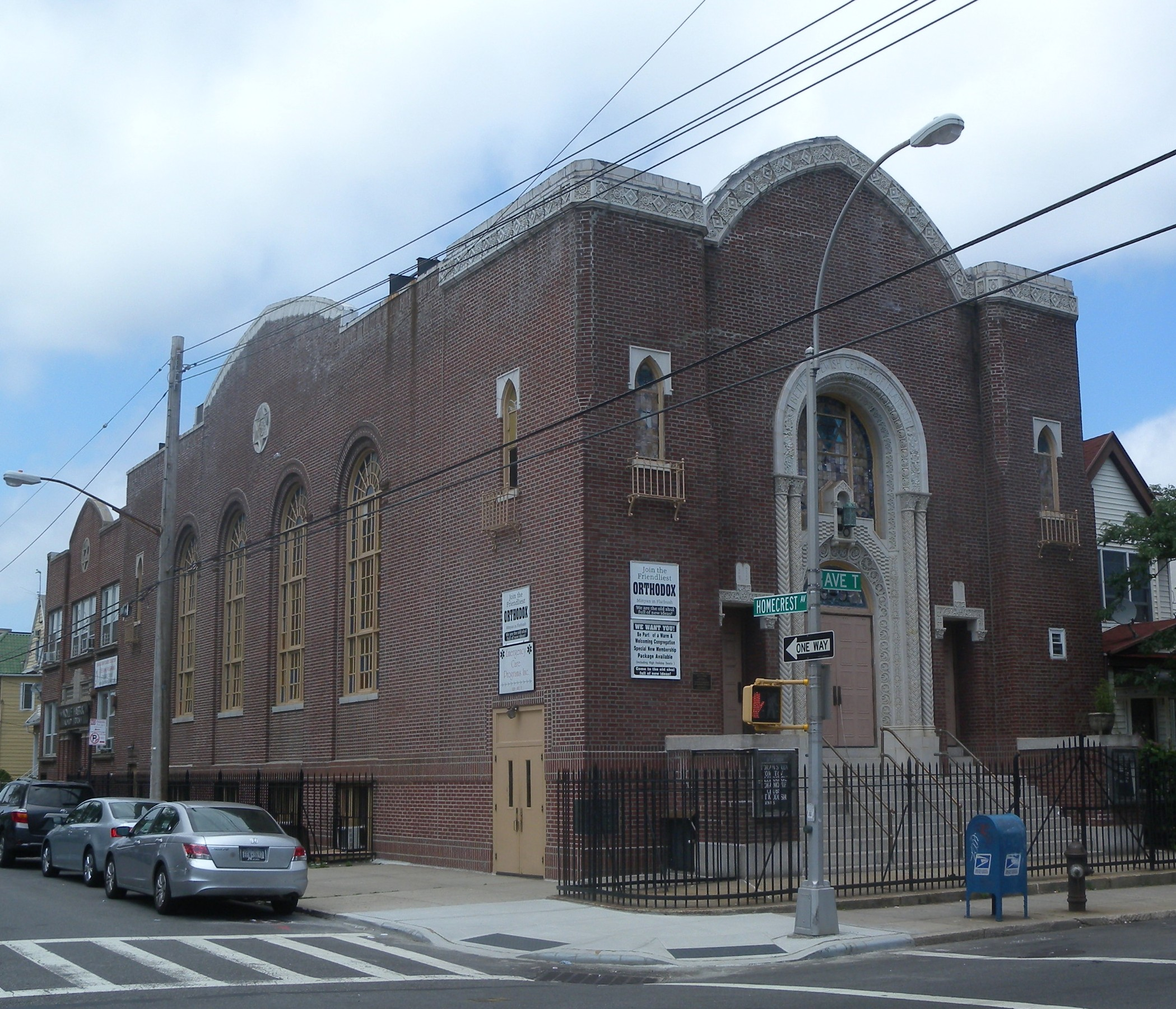
- The historic synagogue, in 2012
- Location: 1981 Homecrest Avenue, Flatbush, Brooklyn, NY
- Coordinates: 40°36′4″N 73°57′35″W
- Area: less than one acre
- NRHP reference No.: 09000377
- NYSRHP No.: 04701.016368

Significant dates
- Added to NRHP: May 29, 2009
- Designated NYSRHP: April 14, 2009

Congregation Beth El of Flatbush, or simply, Beth El of Flatbush, is an Orthodox Jewish congregation and synagogue, located at 2181 East 3rd Street, in Brooklyn, New York City, New York, United States. The congregation worships in the Sephardic rite.

The congregation comprises Jewish people of Sephardic and Middle Eastern descent, including immigrants from Syria, Lebanon, Egypt, Morocco, Israel, Yemen, and Turkey, and their descendants.

The congregation's historic synagogue, called the Beth El Jewish Center of Flatbush, located at 1981 Homecrest Avenue, in Flatbush, Brooklyn, was built in 1927. The two-story plus basement, rectangular red brick building with Byzantine Revival and Gothic Revival decorative elements includes a decorative white glazed terra cotta trim. It has a tripartite front facade with a central parapet. The historic building was listed on the National Register of Historic Places in 2009.
