= Bethel High School (Oklahoma) =

High school in Pottawatomie County, Oklahoma, US

Coordinates: 35.318982°N 97.017907°W

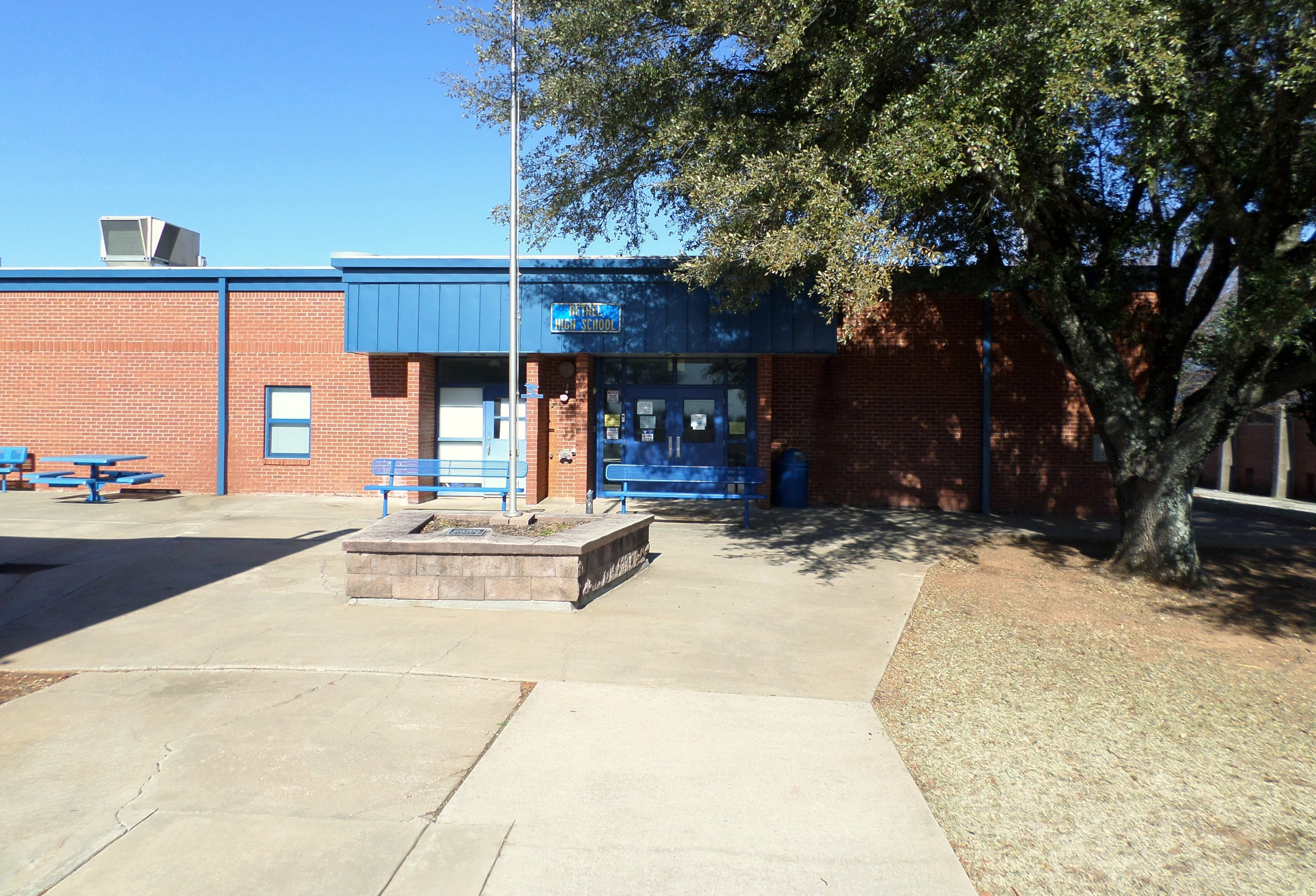

Location
- 36000 Clearpond Road; Shawnee, (Pottawatomie County), Oklahoma 74801; United States

Information
- Type: Public high school
- Principal: Jeremy Stewart
- Staff: 25.40 (FTE)
- Enrollment: 376 (2023-2024)
- Student to teacher ratio: 14.80
- Colors: Blue and gold
- Nickname: Wildcats
- Website: bhs.bethel.k12.ok.us

Bethel High School is a high school located in Bethel Acres, in Pottawatomie County, Oklahoma. It serves approximately 400 students and is part of the Bethel School District.

== History ==
Bethel Acres was opened to non-Indian settlers during the Land Run of 1891. Early settlers set up the school district; classes were held in a brush arbor until a wood-frame building was erected at the corner of Clear Pond and Bethel roads.

== Sports ==
Bethel High School is mainly Class 3A. The slowpitch team is 5A. The school's mascot is the Wildcats and school colors are blue, gold, and white.
