= Beth El Synagogue (Waterbury, Connecticut) =

- U.S. National Register of Historic Places
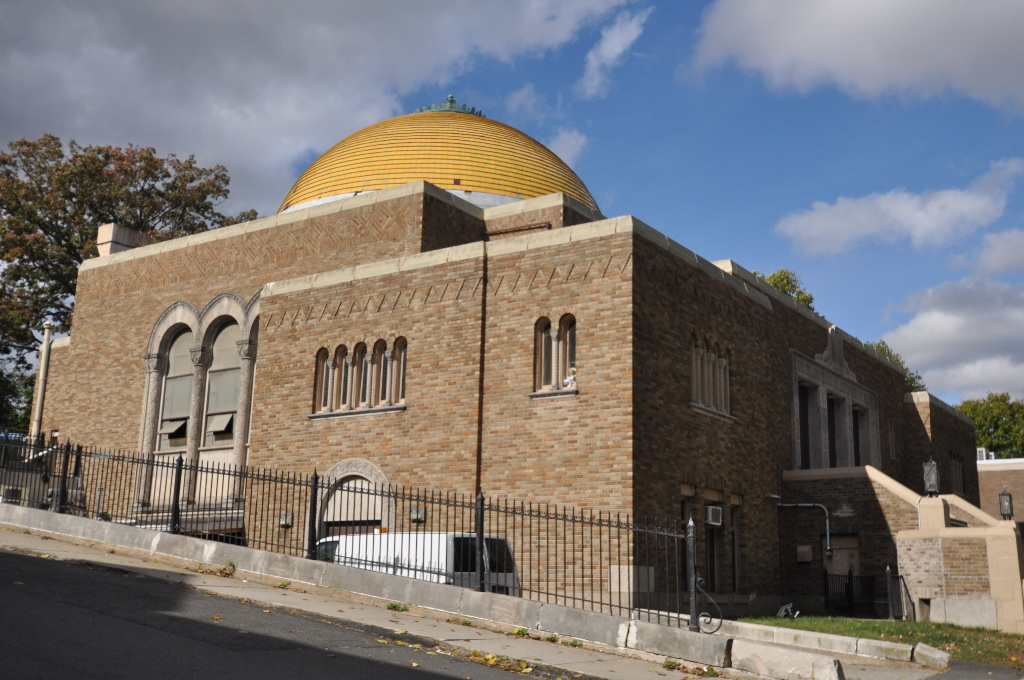

- Location within Connecticut Location within the United States
- Location: 359-375 Cooke Street, Waterbury, Connecticut
- Coordinates: 41°34′3″N 73°2′27″W
- Area: less than one acre
- Built: 1929
- Architect: Myers, Nathan; Stein, Joseph
- Architectural style: Late 19th And 20th Century Revivals, Byzantine
- MPS: Historic Synagogues of Connecticut MPS
- NRHP reference No.: 95000560
- Added to NRHP: May 11, 1995

Beth El Synagogue is a historic synagogue at 359–375 Cooke Street in Waterbury, Connecticut. Built in 1929, it is the first synagogue in the state to be built in the Byzantine Revival style, and was listed on the National Register of Historic Places in 1995 for its architecture. Originally built for a Conservative congregation, it is now home to Yeshiva Ateres Shmuel, a yeshiva.

== Architecture and building history ==
The former Beth El Synagogue stands in a mainly residential area north of downtown Waterbury, on the west side of Cooke Street at its junction with Sterling Street. It is a domed Byzantine Revival-style building, with broad steps leading to a triple entrance on the front facade, which is topped by a carved representation of the Decalogue. The dome is finished in gold, and is topped by a ring of acanthus cresting and a finial. The interior sanctuary space is open to the dome, and has wooden pews divided by three aisles. The front section functions as a small stage, with a proscenium arch and angled walls.

The synagogue was built in the 1920s by the Conservative Beth El Congregation, which was organized c. 1920 and formerly had a synagogue on Park Place. The original design was by architect Nathan Myers, but interior work proceeded slowly after the main construction as financing permitted. The interior finishes in the sanctuary, including detailing in paneling of the bimah, were completed in the 1950s to designs by Waterbury architect Joseph Stein.

The building remained with the Beth El congregation until 2001, when the shrinking congregation sold the building and moved to Southbury.

The building was one of fifteen Connecticut synagogues added to the National Register of Historic Places in 1995 and 1996 in response to an unprecedented multiple submission, nominating nineteen synagogues.

== See also ==
- National Register of Historic Places listings in New Haven County, Connecticut
