= Bethel Acres, Oklahoma =

- Town
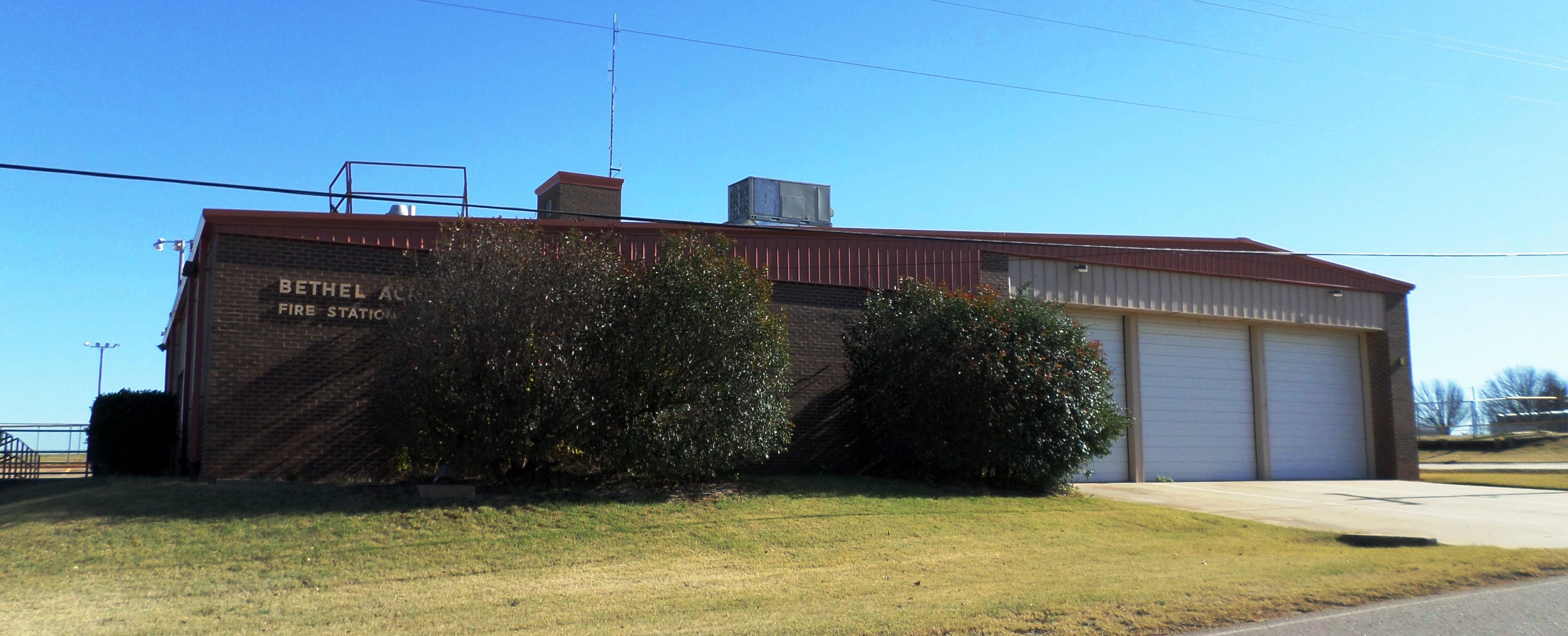
- Bethel Acres Community Building

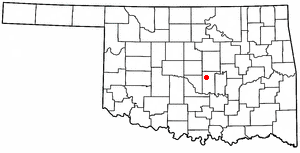
- Location of Bethel Acres, Oklahoma
- Coordinates: 35°18′17″N 97°02′13″W
- Country: United States
- State: Oklahoma
- County: Pottawatomie

Area
  - Total: 28.28 sq mi (73.24 km^{2})
  - Land: 28.27 sq mi (73.22 km^{2})
  - Water: 0.012 sq mi (0.03 km^{2})
- Elevation: 1,139 ft (347 m)

Population (2020)
  - Total: 3,029
  - Density: 107.1/sq mi (41.37/km^{2})
- Time zone: UTC-6 (Central (CST))
  - Summer (DST): UTC-5 (CDT)
- FIPS code: 40-05800
- GNIS feature ID: 2411683
- Website: www.townofbethelacresok.net

Bethel Acres is a town in Pottawatomie County, Oklahoma, United States. As of the 2020 census, Bethel Acres had a population of 3,029. It is primarily a bedroom community for people who work in the three nearby larger cities of Shawnee, Tecumseh and Oklahoma City.

== History ==
The area comprising the present Bethel Acres was opened to non-Indian settlement September 22, 1891. The people who settled here established the Bethel school district. Bethel Acres was not incorporated until April 24, 1962, when the residents feared annexation by Shawnee, Tecumseh or Oklahoma City. They wanted to protect their rural lifestyle, especially to be free to keep livestock on their property.

In 1970, Bethel Acres had 1,083 residents. The number jumped to 2,314 in 1980 and has continued to increase through the 2010 census. Over 97 percent of the employed residents commute to work in Oklahoma City, Shawnee and Tecumseh.

On May 19, 2013, an EF4 tornado tore through Northwest Bethel Acres, and a mobile home park sustained a direct hit from this tornado, killing one person and injuring six others, two critically. This was part of the tornado outbreak of May 18–21, 2013.

== Geography ==
Bethel Acres is 4 miles (6.4 km) west of Shawnee.

According to the United States Census Bureau, the town has a total area of 28.2 square miles (73 km^{2}), of which 28.2 square miles (73 km^{2}) is land and 0.04 square miles (0.10 km^{2}) (0.07%) is water.

== Demographics ==
Historical population
Census	Pop.	Note	%±
1910	388		—
1970	1,083		—
1980	2,314		113.7%
1990	2,505		8.3%
2000	2,735		9.2%
2010	2,895		5.9%
2020	3,029		4.6%
U.S. Decennial Census

=== 2020 census ===
As of the 2020 census, Bethel Acres had a population of 3,029. The median age was 41.7 years. 24.4% of residents were under the age of 18 and 18.3% of residents were 65 years of age or older. For every 100 females there were 103.2 males, and for every 100 females age 18 and over there were 100.1 males age 18 and over.

0.0% of residents lived in urban areas, while 100.0% lived in rural areas.

There were 1,095 households in Bethel Acres, of which 33.9% had children under the age of 18 living in them. Of all households, 61.1% were married-couple households, 16.7% were households with a male householder and no spouse or partner present, and 17.4% were households with a female householder and no spouse or partner present. About 19.4% of all households were made up of individuals and 10.4% had someone living alone who was 65 years of age or older.

There were 1,176 housing units, of which 6.9% were vacant. The homeowner vacancy rate was 0.3% and the rental vacancy rate was 6.7%.

Racial composition as of the 2020 census
Race	Number	Percent
White	2,340	77.3%
Black or African American	32	1.1%
American Indian and Alaska Native	274	9.0%
Asian	15	0.5%
Native Hawaiian and Other Pacific Islander	2	0.1%
Some other race	25	0.8%
Two or more races	341	11.3%
Hispanic or Latino (of any race)	106	3.5%

=== 2000 census ===
As of the census of 2000, there were 2,735 people, 985 households, and 816 families residing in the town. The population density was 96.9 inhabitants per square mile (37.4/km^{2}). There were 1,104 housing units at an average density of 39.1 per square mile (15.1/km^{2}). The racial makeup of the town was 88.56% White, 0.51% African American, 5.92% Native American, 0.33% Asian, 0.04% Pacific Islander, 0.44% from other races, and 4.20% from two or more races. Hispanic or Latino of any race were 1.32% of the population.

There were 985 households, out of which 37.0% had children under the age of 18 living with them, 70.9% were married couples living together, 7.9% had a female householder with no husband present, and 17.1% were non-families. 15.2% of all households were made up of individuals, and 5.6% had someone living alone who was 65 years of age or older. The average household size was 2.72 and the average family size was 3.01.

In the town, the population was spread out, with 27.7% under the age of 18, 6.9% from 18 to 24, 27.5% from 25 to 44, 25.2% from 45 to 64, and 12.7% who were 65 years of age or older. The median age was 38 years. For every 100 females, there were 103.0 males. For every 100 females age 18 and over, there were 97.9 males.

The median income for a household in the town was $43,961, and the median income for a family was $45,000. Males had a median income of $37,390 versus $24,185 for females. The per capita income for the town was $18,826. About 5.3% of families and 6.3% of the population were below the poverty line, including 9.1% of those under age 18 and 6.4% of those age 65 or over.

== Education ==
The majority of Bethel Acres is within the Bethel Public Schools school district. A small piece extends into Shawnee Public Schools.

Four schools make up Bethel Public Schools, including an upper elementary, lower elementary, middle school and Bethel High School. Tod Harrison is the superintendent.

== Notable person ==
- Wade Hayes, singer
