= Bethel African Methodist Episcopal Church =

Bethel African Methodist Episcopal Church, Bethel AME Church, Greater Bethel AME Church or Union Bethel AME Church may refer to:

== Arkansas ==
- Bethel African Methodist Episcopal Church (Batesville, Arkansas)
- Bethel African Methodist Episcopal Church (Malvern, Arkansas)

== California ==
- Bethel African Methodist Episcopal Church (Sacramento, California)
- Bethel African Methodist Episcopal Church (San Francisco, California)

== Florida ==
- Greater Bethel AME Church (Miami, Florida)

== Georgia ==
- Bethel AME Church (Acworth, Georgia), listed on the NRHP in Cobb County

== Indiana ==
- Bethel AME Church of Crawfordsville
- Bethel African Methodist Episcopal Church (Franklin, Indiana)
- Bethel A.M.E. Church (Indianapolis, Indiana)
- Bethel A.M.E. Church (Richmond, Indiana)

== Iowa ==
- Bethel African Methodist Episcopal Church (Cedar Rapids, Iowa)
- Bethel AME Church (Davenport, Iowa)
- Bethel AME Church (Iowa City, Iowa)

== Kansas ==
- Bethel African Methodist Episcopal Church (Coffeyville, Kansas)
- Bethel A.M.E. Church (Manhattan, Kansas), listed on the NRHP in Riley County

== Kentucky ==
- Bethel AME Church (Shelbyville, Kentucky)

== Louisiana ==
- Union Bethel A.M.E. Church (New Orleans, Louisiana)

== Massachusetts ==
- Bethel African Methodist Episcopal Church and Parsonage, Plymouth
- Bethel African Methodist Episcopal (AME) Church, Boston.

== Mississippi ==
- Bethel African Methodist Episcopal Church (Vicksburg, Mississippi)

== Missouri ==
- Bethel Chapel AME Church, Louisiana, Missouri

== Montana ==
- Union Bethel African Methodist Episcopal Church (Great Falls, Montana), listed on the NRHP in Cascade County

== Nevada ==
- Bethel AME Church (Reno, Nevada)

== New Jersey ==
- Bethel A.M.E. Church (Morristown, New Jersey)
- Bethel African Methodist Episcopal Church (Springtown, New Jersey)

== New York ==
- Bethel AME Church and Manse, Huntington
- Greater Bethel AME Church (Harlem, New York)

== Pennsylvania ==
- Bethel African Methodist Episcopal Church of Monongahela City
- Mother Bethel A.M.E. Church, Philadelphia, the founding church of the African Methodist Episcopal Church denomination
- Bethel A.M.E. Church (Reading, Pennsylvania)

== South Carolina ==
- Bethel A.M.E. Church (Columbia, South Carolina)
- Bethel African Methodist Episcopal Church (McClellanville, South Carolina)

== Virginia ==
- Third Street Bethel A.M.E. Church, Richmond

== West Virginia ==
- Bethel AME Church (Parkersburg, West Virginia)

== See also ==
- Bethel Baptist Church (disambiguation)
- Bethel Methodist Church (disambiguation)
- Bethel Methodist Episcopal Church (disambiguation)
