= Bethel Church =

Bethel Church may refer to:

== Denominations ==
- Gereja Bethel Indonesia

== Individual church buildings and congregations ==
United States

- Bethel Church (Jacksonville, Florida)
- Bethel Church (Redding, California)
- Bethel United Methodist Church (Lake City, Florida)
- Bethel Church and Graveyard, Attica, Indiana
- Bethel Church (Morning Sun, Iowa)
- Bethel Church (Clay Village, Kentucky)
- Bethel Cemetery and Church, Falmouth, Kentucky
- Bethel Church (Labadie, Missouri)
- Bethel Church Arbor, Midland, North Carolina
- John Herrington House and Herrington Bethel Church, Mechanicstown, Ohio
- Bethel Church (Yale, South Dakota)
- Mount Bethel Church (Three Churches, West Virginia)

== See also ==
- Bethel African Methodist Episcopal Church (disambiguation)
- Bethel Baptist Church (disambiguation)
- Bethel Methodist Church (disambiguation)
- Bethel Presbyterian Church (disambiguation)
- Bethel Chapel (disambiguation)
- Bethel (disambiguation)
- Betel Church (disambiguation)
