= Bethel Methodist Church =

Bethel Methodist Church or Bethel Methodist Episcopal Church or Old Bethel Methodist Church may refer to:

- Bethel Methodist Church (denomination), a small Texas-based denomination

or it may refer to individual church buildings/congregations:

- Old Bethel Methodist Church (Arkansas), near Paragould, Arkansas, listed on the National Register of Historic Places (NRHP)
- Bethel Methodist Protestant Church, Andrewsville, Delaware, NRHP-listed
- Bethel Methodist Episcopal Church (Bluffton, Indiana), NRHP-listed
- Mount Bethel Methodist Church, Vienna, New Jersey, NRHP-listed
- Bethel Methodist Church (Bantam, Ohio), NRHP-listed
- Bethel Methodist Episcopal Church (Pleasant City, Ohio), NRHP-listed
- Bethel Methodist Church (Charleston, South Carolina), NRHP-listed
- Old Bethel United Methodist Church, also in Charleston, South Carolina, also NRHP-listed

== See also ==
- Bethel Baptist Church (disambiguation)
- Bethel African Methodist Episcopal Church (disambiguation)
