= Bethel Chapel =

Bethel Chapel may refer to:

== United Kingdom ==
=== England ===
- Bethel Chapel, Guildford, Surrey
- Bethel Strict Baptist Chapel, Robertsbridge, East Sussex
- Bethel Chapel, Shelf, West Yorkshire
- Bethel Chapel, Staithes, North Yorkshire

=== Wales ===
- Bethel Chapel, Abernant
- Bethel Chapel, Gadlys
- Bethel Baptist Chapel, Llanelli
- Bethel Chapel, Miskin
- Bethel Chapel, Ynysybwl

== United States ==
- Bethel Chapel AME Church, Louisiana, Missouri
- Bethel Chapel Pentecostal Church, Granite City, Illinois

== See also ==
- Bethel Church (disambiguation)
