= Derwent, Ohio =

Unincorporated community in Ohio, U.S.

Coordinates: 39°55′23″N 81°32′39″W

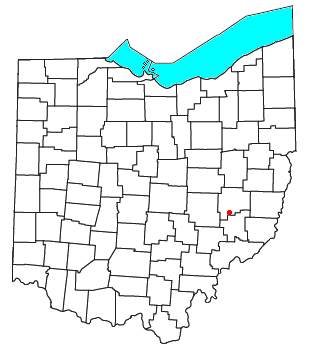
Location of Derwent, Ohio

Derwent is an unincorporated community in central Valley Township, Guernsey County, Ohio, United States. It is located near the southern border of Guernsey and Noble counties.

Derwent lies in southeastern Ohio, a part of the Unglaciated Allegheny Plateau region. It is located about seven miles from Senecaville Lake. State Route 313 (Clay Pike Road) runs on the southern edge of Derwent, and its interchange with Interstate 77 is a little over 1 mile (1.6 km) away. Major cities nearby include Zanesville (33.5 miles (53.9 km)) and Marietta (40 miles (64 km)). The intersection of two cross-country highways (Interstate 77 and 70) is 8 miles (13 km) away.

The Penn Central rail line ran through the eastern portion of Derwent (heading south to Marietta) and which crossed the Baltimore and Ohio rail line ran immediately to the south, heading toward Cumberland, Ohio and which eventually terminated at the Muskingum Electric Railroad. The former Penn Central line is in the process of being rebuilt by the Byesville Scenic Railway.

== History ==
Derwent was platted in 1898.
