= Bethel A.M.E. Church (Morristown, New Jersey) =

Church in Morristown, New Jersey, USA

Coordinates: 40.79963°N 74.47901°W

Bethel Church of Morristown
- Bethel African Methodist Episcopal Church of Morristown
- Bethel Church of Morristown
- Location: Morristown, New Jersey
- Address: 59 Spring Street, Morristown, New Jersey 07960
- Country: United States
- Denomination: Episcopal Church
- Website: https://www.bethelmorristown.org/

History
- Founded: 1843
- Founder: Mother Frances Freeman Ray

Architecture
- Functional status: Active

Bethel African Methodist Episcopal Church is a church in Morristown, New Jersey, USA.

It was the first black congregation in Morris County, incorporated in 1843 by the Bethel Mite Society, which raised funds to construct the 1849 Carpenter Gothic church on Spring Street. The current building was dedicated in 1970.

== History ==
Prior to 1843, worshippers met as of "The Bethel Mite Society", at various locations in Morristown, including a small house on High Street, a carpentry shop on Speedwell Avenue, a blacksmith shop on Morris Street and a house at 34 Spring Street. On December 18, 1843, the church incorporated as "The African Methodist Episcopal Church of Morristown".

In 1844, William Sayre, Jr. conveyed to the church corporation a parcel of property on the west side of Spring Street. Willis Nazery was Bethel's first pastor of record. He was born a slave in 1803 in Isle of Wight County in Virginia. After ordination as an A.M.E. bishop on May 13, 1852, in New York City, Bishop Nazery was sent to Canada to found congregations. He is recognized as an Underground Railroad conductor. He became the first bishop of the new British Methodist Episcopal Church, which was organized by freedmen and fugitive slaves.

In 1849, Bethel's first church building was completed and dedicated with Bishop Paul Quinn officiating, assisted by the pastor, Rev. Thomas Oliver. The church then reorganized as "The African Methodist Episcopal Bethel Church of Morristown" and received a new Certificate of Incorporation on September 28, 1859.

On July 29th, 1874, John R. and Cornelia Piper purchased a 70 by 160 feet (21 m × 49 m) lot on the east side of Spring Street for the sum of $2,000.

- 1874 – According to Bethel’s church history, "Trustees proposed and built a church 34 by 50 feet (10 m × 15 m) at an estimated cost of $3,000. Gifts from Mrs. George T. (Mary Anne) Cobb of pews, doors and windows from the old Methodist Church [on the Morristown Green] helped in this great work." The existing house on the lot was moved next door and used as a parsonage.
- 1876 – New church as well as property on west side of Spring Street lost in Sheriff’s Sale on June 12, 1876. Present property purchased by George L. Hull, who on September 7, 1878, conveyed it to the Young Men’s Christian Association (YMCA) of Morristown, New Jersey.
- July 1, 1943 – At a meeting called for the purpose, the name of the corporation was changed to "Bethel African Methodist Episcopal Church, Morristown, NJ".
- July 28, 1943 – Present property conveyed to the church corporation by the YMCA.
- December 12–19, 1943 – Bethel celebrated its 100th anniversary. Rev. Alexander White (pastor), Rev. L.J.B. Bell (presiding elder) and Rt. Rev. David H. Sims (presiding bishop) officiated.
- 1947 – A mortgage burning celebration was held under the pastorate of Rev. Alexander White.
- 1948 - The Urban League of Morris County was formed, with Rev. White as its first president and Mrs. Genevieve Steele, a Bethel steward, s treasurer.
- 1956-68 – During the 12 year pastorate of Rev. Samuel S. Singleton, a building fund of $45,000 was raised toward the construction a new church.
- August 12, 1967 – Under leadership of the pastor, Rev. A. Lewis Williams, a groundbreaking ceremony was held for new church.
- 1968–1970 – The congregation worshipped in the Lafayette School auditorium for two and one half years until the construction of the church was completed.
- November 8, 1970 – After numerous setbacks and financial difficulties, the present church was completed and dedicated. Rev. A. Lewis Williams was subsequently served the editor of The Christian Recorder from 1973 to 1976.
- December 19, 1987 – Under the pastorate of Rev. Clarence B. Crawford, a mortgage burning celebration was held with Presiding Elder Rev. Bynum C. Burton and Presiding Bishop Rt. Rev. Frank C. Cummings also officiating.
- 1992 – Under the leadership of the pastor, Rev. Joseph Whalen, Sr., renovation of the parsonage at 39 Hillairy Avenue was undertaken. The project was completed in April 1993 and the parsonage was dedicated in July 1993 by the pastor, Rev. Harvey H. B. Sparkman, III.
- 1999 – Bethel ANGELS HIV/AIDS Ministry established under Sparkman's leadership.
- 2001 – Under the leadership of the pastorate of Rev. Louis Attles, an elevator was installed and several renovations were made to make the church handicap-accessible.
- 2005-10 – Under the pastorate of Rev. Alfonso Sherald, Bethel’s facilities were used for Sunday afternoon worship services, as well as other weekly gatherings and meetings, by a local Latino Christian congregation. Rev. Sherald was also president of the Morris County Branch of the NAACP and chaplain at the Youth Guidance Center of Morris County.
- November 10, 2010 – The Rev. Sidney S. Williams, Jr. was appointed as the 51st pastor of Bethel. In addition to installing the congregation's first baptismal pool, there have been many other accomplishments. Under his leadership, the street name adjacent to the church was changed from Center Street to Bishop Nazery Way, the congregation embarked on its first missions trip outside the US spending a week in the Dominican Republic and the congregation launched its Community Development Center, the Spring Street CDC.
- August 28, 2011 –The church sustained extensive water damage from Hurricane Irene. Members, local churches and many volunteers contributed countless hours of work before Sunday worship services resumed at Bethel on October 9, 2011.

In November of 2017, Bethel A.M.E. Church was one of five targets of a racially motivated vandalism attack.
