= New Bethel Baptist Church =

New Bethel Baptist Church may refer to:

- New Bethel Baptist Church (Detroit, Michigan)
- New Bethel Baptist Church (Oak Ridge, Tennessee)

== See also ==
- Bethel Baptist Church (disambiguation)
