= Betel Church =

Betel Church may refer to:

== Finland ==
- Betel Church (Turku)
- Betel Church, Viipuri^{[fi]}

== Sweden ==
- Betel Church, multiple; see list of churches in Sweden
  - Betel Church, Ljungby^{[sv]}
  - Betel Church, Malmö^{[sv]}
  - Betel Church, Örebro^{[sv]}
  - Betel Church, Stockholm^{[sv]}

== Other ==
- Betel Church, Romania; see list of religious buildings in Timișoara

== See also ==
- Bethel Church (disambiguation)
