= Bethel A.M.E. Church (Columbia, South Carolina) =

Historic church in South Carolina, United States

- U.S. National Register of Historic Places
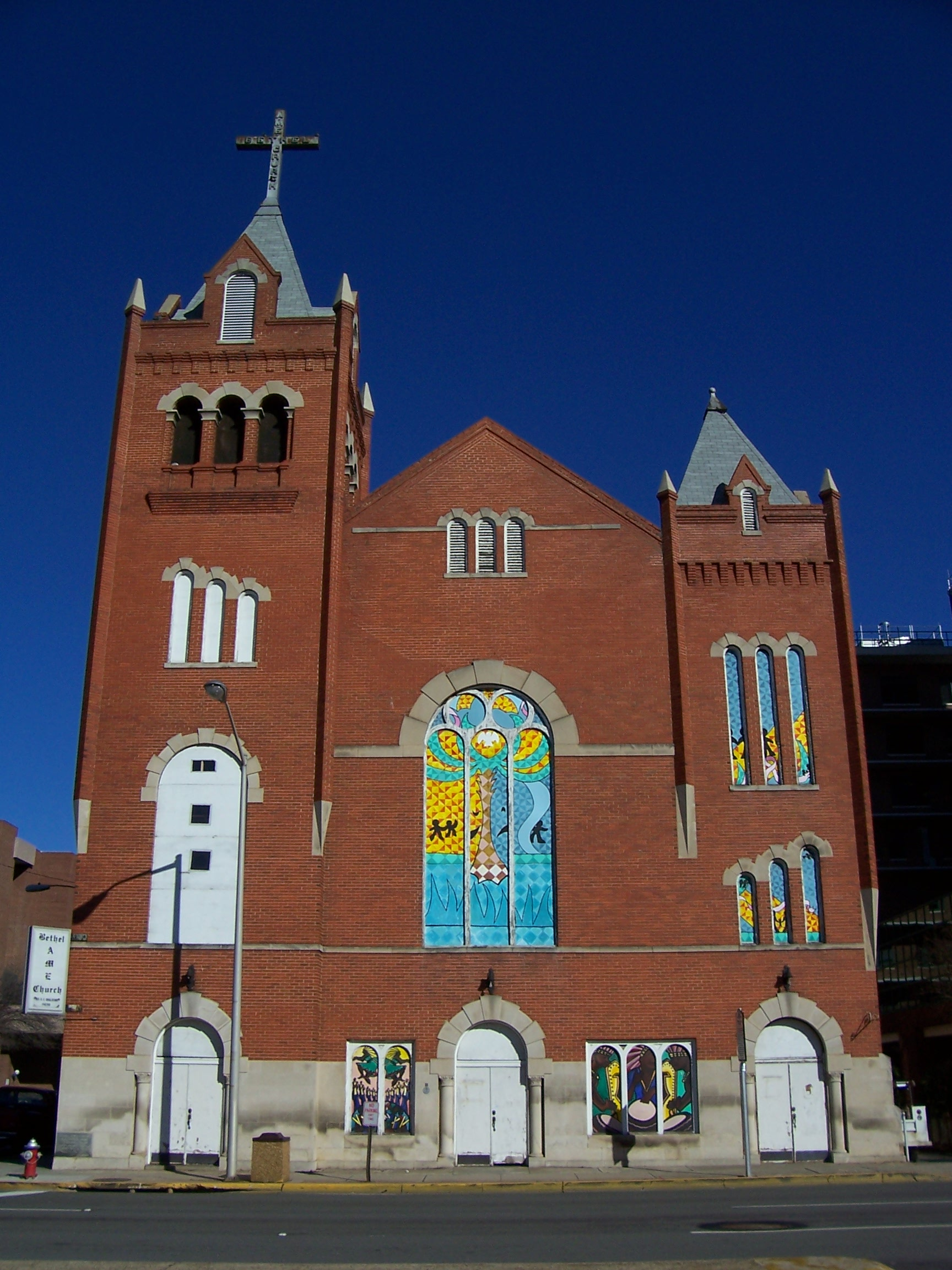

- Location within South Carolina Location within the United States
- Location: 1528 Sumter St., Columbia, South Carolina
- Coordinates: 34°0′25″N 81°2′3″W
- Area: less than one acre
- Built: 1921
- Architect: Lankford, John Anderson
- Architectural style: Romanesque
- MPS: Columbia MRA
- NRHP reference No.: 82003899
- Added to NRHP: May 24, 1982

Bethel A.M.E. Church is a historic African Methodist Episcopal Church at 1528 Sumter Street in Columbia, South Carolina.

It was built in 1921 and added to the National Register in 1982.
