= John Herrington House and Herrington Bethel Church =

- U.S. National Register of Historic Places
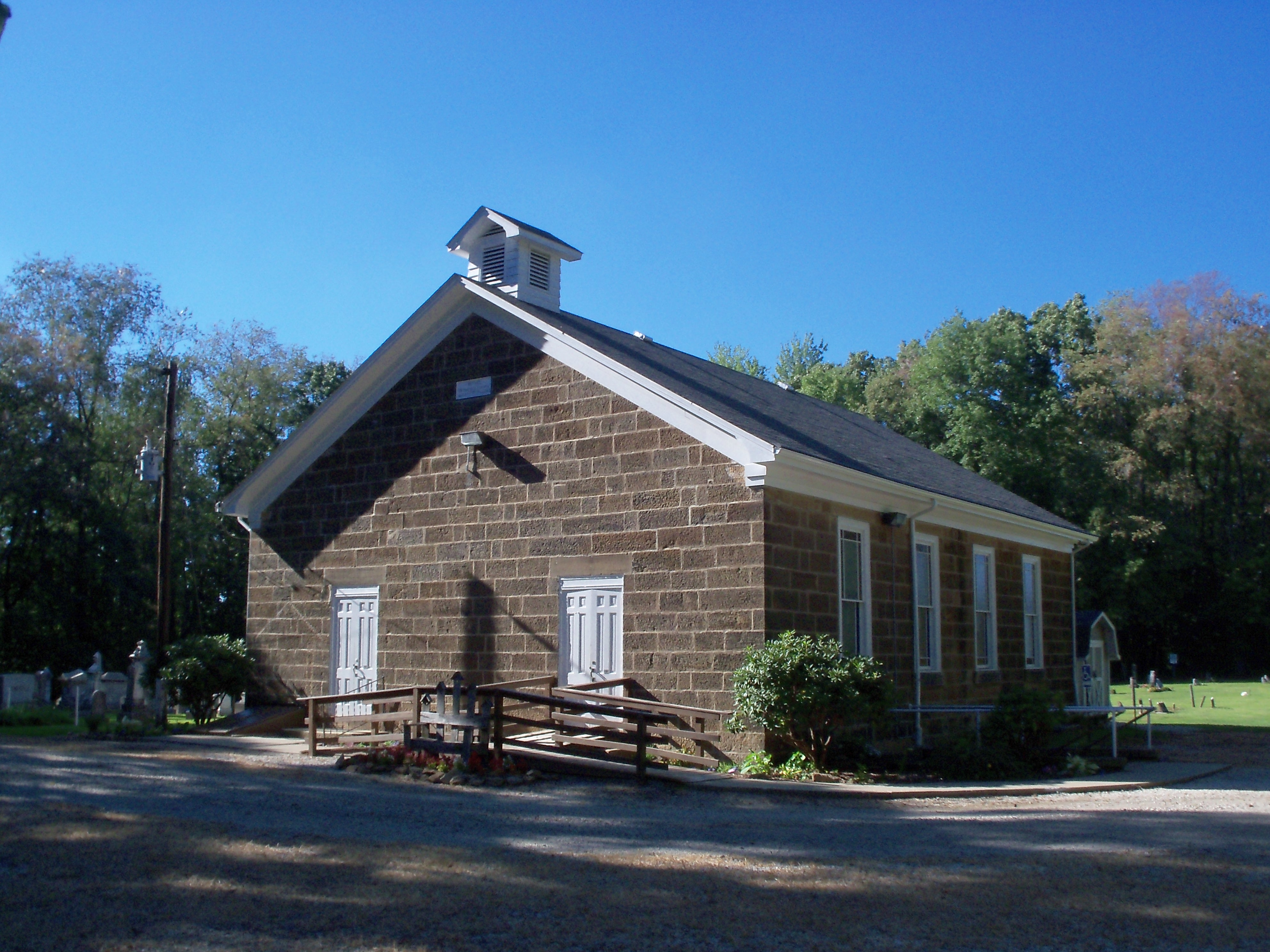
- Front and side of the church

- Location within Ohio Location within the United States
- Location: 4070 Arbor Rd. NE, Mechanicstown, Ohio
- Coordinates: 40°38′57″N 81°0′46″W
- Area: 3 acres (1.2 ha)
- Built: 1840
- Architect: Frank Dunmore
- Architectural style: Federal
- NRHP reference No.: 83001949
- Added to NRHP: January 19, 1983

The John Herrington House and Herrington Bethel Church are a pair of historic buildings located near Mechanicstown in Carroll County, Ohio, United States. Constructed in the 1840s, they bear the name of a prominent local Methodist minister, and they have together been named a historic site.

Pennsylvania native John Herrington migrated west to eastern Ohio following the American Revolution, in which he served as a drummer boy. Upon settling in present-day Carroll County, he began farming and preaching Methodism among the pioneer settlers, and he became one of the area's preëminent early religious leaders. Herrington's home served as the house of worship for his congregation until the church building was constructed in 1843, three years after a new house was built for him.

Constructed of sandstone, the church was seemingly built under the direction of a local black craftsman, Frank Dunmore, who may also have been responsible for Herrington's house. The church is a simple gable-front design with one door on either side of the facade, while four windows pierce the sides, and a small cupola sits atop the roofline just behind the peak of the gable. Behind the church sits the congregation's graveyard, while a woodlot lies beyond the graveyard.

In 1983, the church and Herrington's house were listed together on the National Register of Historic Places. Religious properties are ordinarily not eligible for addition to the Register, but the Herrington complex was included because of its profound significance in local history. Few other extant properties are so closely connected to the settlement of Carroll County and the development of its religious institutions (particularly because of Herrington's dual rôle as a farmer and a preacher), and the well-preserved stonework of the two buildings represents an incomparable example of pre-Civil War stone vernacular construction in the area.
