= Bethel Baptist Church =

Bethel Baptist Church may refer to:

== United Kingdom ==
- Bethel Chapel Guildford, Surrey
- Bethel Baptist Chapel, Llanelli, Carmarthenshire
- Bethel Strict Baptist Chapel, Robertsbridge, East Sussex

== United States ==
- Bethel Baptist Church (Birmingham, Alabama), a U.S. National Historic Landmark in Alabama
- Bethel Baptist Church (Fairview, Kentucky), listed on the NRHP in Kentucky
- Bethel Baptist Church (Jennings, Louisiana)
- Mount Bethel Baptist Meetinghouse, listed on the NRHP in New Jersey
- Bethel Baptist Church (Pataskala, Ohio), listed on the NRHP in Ohio
- Bethel Baptist Church (Gresham, Oregon)
- Bethel Baptist Church (Sumter, South Carolina)
- Bethel Baptist Church (Houston, Texas), listed on the NRHP in Texas
- Bethel Baptist Church (Midlothian, Virginia), listed on the NRHP in Virginia
- Bethel Baptist Church (Fort Pierce, Florida)
- Bethel Church (Jacksonville, Florida), formerly the Bethel Baptist Institutional Church, listed on the NRHP in Florida
- Bethel Baptist Church (Marquette, Michigan )

== See also ==
- Bethel (disambiguation)
- Bethel Church (disambiguation)
- New Bethel Baptist Church (disambiguation)
