= Bethel Methodist Episcopal Church (Pleasant City, Ohio) =

Historic church in Ohio, United States

- U.S. National Register of Historic Places
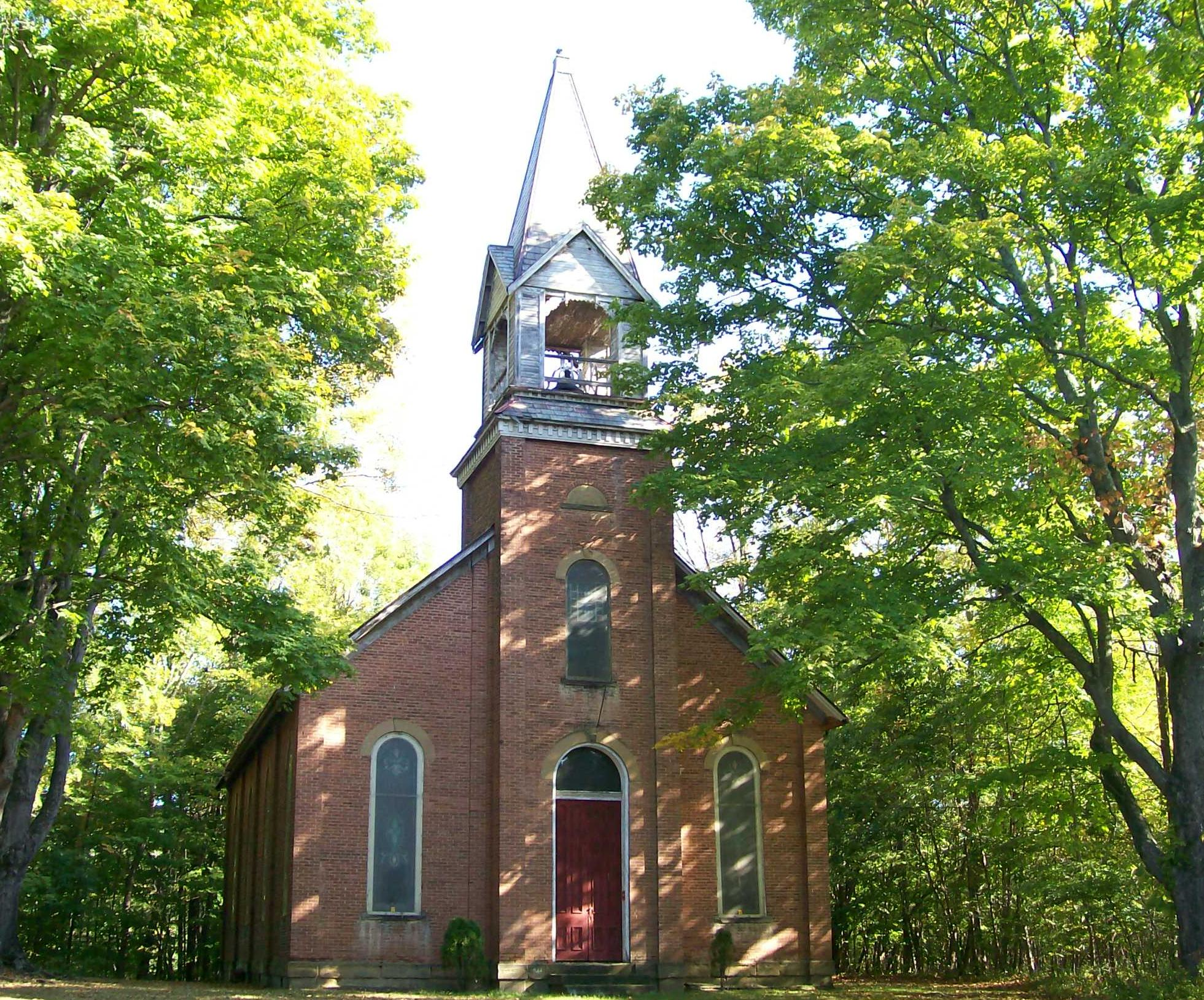
- The Bethel M.E. Church in Guernsey County.

- Location within Ohio Location within the United States
- Nearest city: Pleasant City, Ohio
- Coordinates: 39°54′4″N 81°35′1″W
- Area: less than one acre
- Built: 1873
- Architectural style: Romanesque Revival
- NRHP reference No.: 78002072
- Added to NRHP: November 24, 1978

The Bethel Methodist Episcopal Church is located west of Pleasant City, Ohio on SR 146. The church was placed on the National Register of Historic Places on November 24, 1978.

== History ==
The Methodist presence in Guernsey County was localized around what is today Valley Township even before this township was created. The congregation met in the barns of several members until the needs for a church building became evident in the early 19th century. In 1832, John Robins donated a site on the southern side of SR 146 for a church and cemetery. The resulting frame building was used until 1873. Growth in membership caused the building to become too small, and the idea of a new building was discussed. The new site chosen was across the road and construction on the new building began in 1871. The church was finally completed in 1873 in the Romanesque Revival style, reminiscent of the many churches in the New England states. The architect is unknown, but several candidates have been named.

The church was remodeled in 1898; worn-out decorations were repaired, and the building was restored to its former glory. The rededication was led by Dr. David H. Moore. After the church moved in 1960 to the city of Cambridge, a community organization, Bethel Community Church, Inc., was formed to protect the building from alteration or destruction, and the East Ohio Annual Conference sold them the building for one dollar. Following this transaction, the church was converted into a community center.

== Exterior ==
The rectangular red brick structure is located on a shady tree-filled plot. The front facade is three bays wide, with a central projection containing large wooden double doors. Above the doors is a fanlight to allow the morning light to penetrate the building. To either side of the door is a large rectangular stained glass window, designed and shipped from Germany. Above the entrance is a large arched window similar to the lower side windows.

The central projection is topped by a bell tower which rests on a dentil cornice. The arched openings of the tower are decorated with wooden fretwork and the original bell rests on its mount; the bell's mechanism still works. The tower is capped by a spire which once housed a lightning rod, but now ends in a ball.

The side facade is lined with four large arched windows similar to the front, also from Germany. The windows are each topped with a sandstone arch with a large projecting keystone.

The church was heavily vandalized in 2005, leaving a large hole in the triple mason walls, and all of the windows broken, many beyond recognition. The burdens of maintaining the church as well as repairing the damage are more than can be covered by the current caretaker, so much of the damage is still evident.
