= Third Street Bethel A.M.E. Church =

Historic church in Virginia, US

- U.S. National Register of Historic Places
- Virginia Landmarks Register
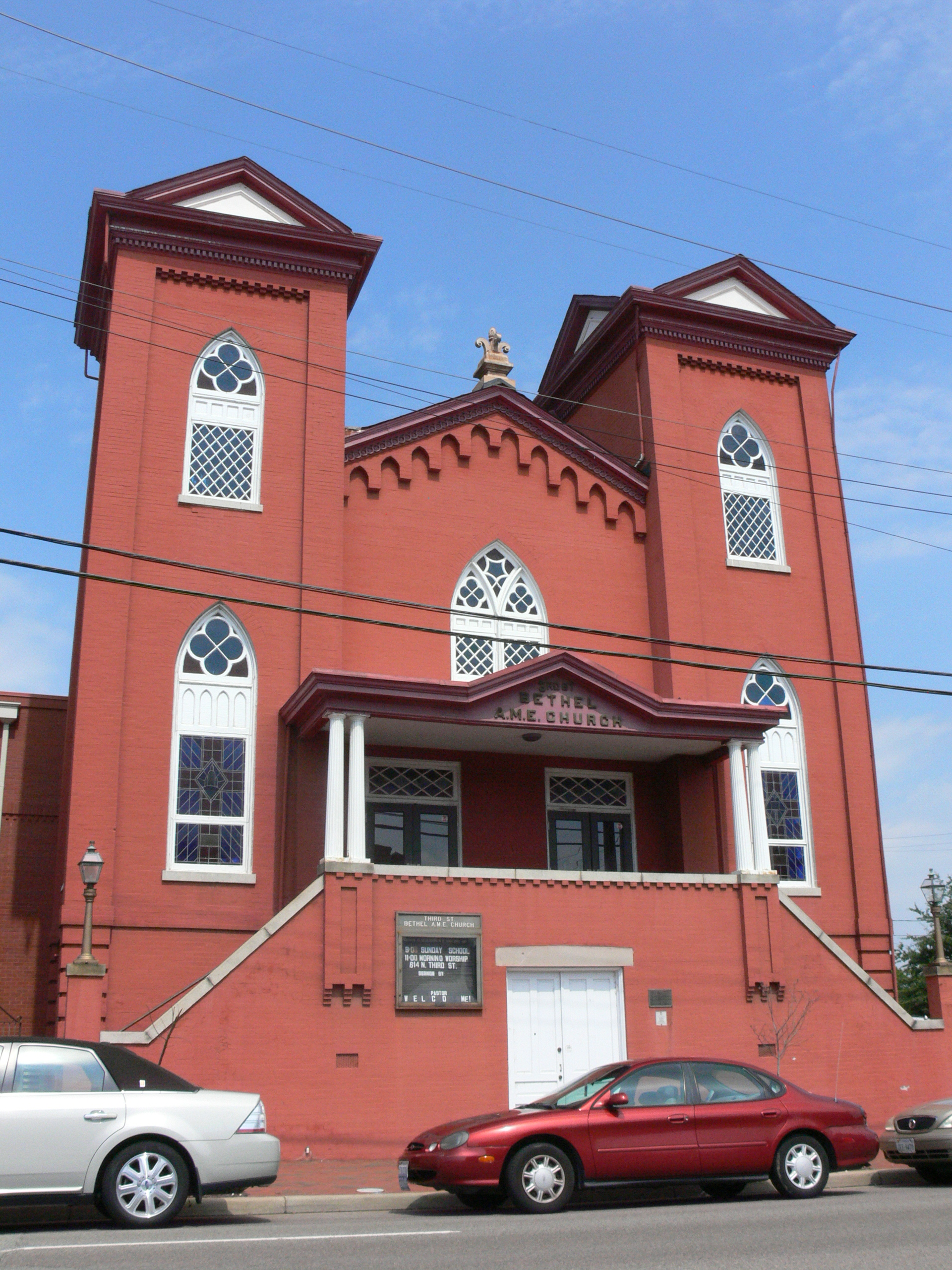
- Third Street Bethel A.M.E. Church, August 2011

- Location within Virginia Location within the United States
- Location: 616 N. 3rd St., Richmond, Virginia
- Coordinates: 37°32′51″N 77°26′11″W
- Area: less than one acre
- Built: 1857, 1875
- Architectural style: Gothic
- NRHP reference No.: 75002117 (original); 100004265 (increase)
- VLR No.: 127-0274

Significant dates
- Added to NRHP: June 5, 1975
- Boundary increase: August 7, 2019
- Designated VLR: February 18, 1975

Third Street Bethel A.M.E. Church is a historic African Methodist Episcopal church located in Richmond, Virginia. It built in 1857, and remodeled in 1875. It is a large Victorian Gothic brick building with two-story towers flanking a central gable. The central gable and towers feature Gothic lancet windows.

It was listed on the National Register of Historic Places in 1975, with an enlargement of the listing in 2019.
