= Bethel African Methodist Episcopal Church and Parsonage =

Historic church in Massachusetts, United States

- U.S. National Register of Historic Places
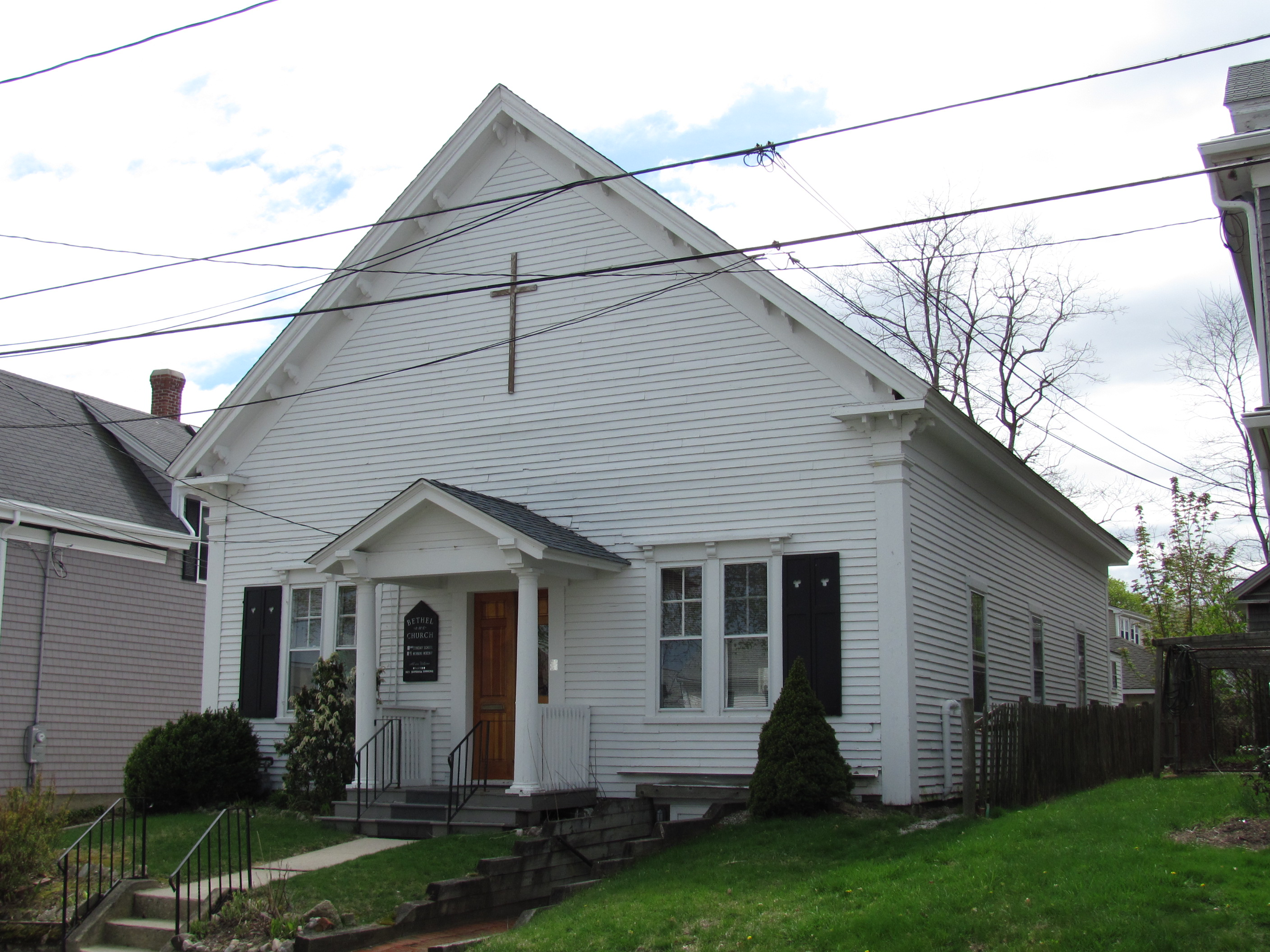
- Bethel African Methodist Episcopal Church

- Location within Massachusetts Location within the United States
- Location: Plymouth, Massachusetts
- Coordinates: 41°57′25″N 70°40′8″W
- Area: less than one acre
- Built: c. 1840; 1870
- Architectural style: Italianate
- NRHP reference No.: 07000168
- Added to NRHP: March 19, 2007

The Bethel African Methodist Episcopal Church and Parsonage is an historic church and parsonage at 6 Sever Street in Plymouth, Massachusetts. The congregation, founded in 1866, is one of a small number of African Methodist Episcopal (AME) congregations in eastern Massachusetts, and is an enduring component of the small African-American community in Plymouth. Its church, built about 1840 as a commercial building and consecrated in 1870, was listed on the National Register of Historic Places in 2007.

== Description and history ==
The Bethel AME Church is located a short south of Plymouth's downtown Main Street area, on the south side of Sever Street west of Russell Street. It is located in a densely built residential area. The church is a modest 1 1/2-story wood-frame structure, with a gabled roof and clapboarded exterior. It exhibits transitional Greek Revival-Italianate styling, with corner pilasters, paired brackets in the eaves, and gable end returns. The main facade is symmetrical, with paired sash windows flanking the center entrance. The windows are topped by bracketed projecting cornices and are articulated by narrow pilasters. The entrance is simply framed, and is sheltered by a gabled portico with Doric columns. The parsonage house is a vernacular 1 1/2-story wood-frame house located about 20 feet (6.1 m) behind the church; it was built in 1895.

The church building's construction date is unknown: the lot was empty in 1830, and the building stood there on an 1858 map. It was apparently built for commercial purposes, housing diverse businesses such as gymnasium, shoe shop, and school, prior to its acquisition by the AME congregation in 1870. Plymouth has historically had a small African-American population, which was in 1850 recorded to number 138. Members of this population organized the AME congregation in 1866, meeting in a small converted house on Billington Street. Seeking a larger space, the congregation purchased this building in 1870. Most of the congregation's pastors were either unpaid or little-paid, and many served the congregation only a short time, often supplementing their religious mission with other work.

== See also ==
- National Register of Historic Places listings in Plymouth County, Massachusetts
