= Mortgage burning =

Ritual celebration of mortgage payment competition

Mortgage burning was a twentieth-century custom in the United States of America (U.S.A.) that was the ritual incineration of the promissory note (mortgage) upon satisfaction of the payment schedule by the purchaser (debtor or mortgagor). This ritual was performed to celebrate the release of the debtor from further payment obligations, and was sometimes accompanied by a party in which extended family and friends were invited.

== History ==
Home mortgage burnings, and particularly home mortgage burning parties, are nearly unheard of in the present-day United States for a few reasons. In the early twenty-first century, due to increased mobility and other factors, few U.S. mortgagees continue to make payments until the end of the mortgage term. Typically, mortgagees sell or refinance a property before the end of the mortgage term, using proceeds of the sale or new loan to extinguish the debt used to acquire the property.

Also, starting in the late twentieth century and until the 2000s United States housing bubble (circa 2007 or 2008) burst, it was fairly common for a borrower to acquire property using an excessively leveraged mortgage, and possibly even an “interest-only” mortgage, wherein a borrower pays only interest but does not repay principal. These mortgages were acquired with the implicit, though not always explicit, understanding that the property was likely to be re-sold or re-financed well before the end of the mortgage term. Refinancing, or restructuring of mortgage terms, was often undertaken to obtain a lower interest rate, or to borrow more money by increasing the principal (amount borrowed) of the mortgage. Refinancing a mortgage loan entails “resetting the clock” on the loan period, typically extending the time that the borrower promises to make payments beyond the end of the original loan term.

Even when a mortgage is satisfied (“paid off”) at the conclusion of payments, throwing a party to celebrate is considered to be in poor taste as it seen as bragging about one’s secure financial condition as opposed to a standard rite of passage. Modern advice columnists and etiquette experts generally advise against having mortgage burning parties attended by anyone other than immediate family.

Mortgage burning parties are still held by non-profit entities such as churches. In those cases, the attendees are generally those who helped to pay off the mortgage.

== In popular culture ==
The burning of a mortgage was depicted in the 1949 MGM Tracy-Hepburn comedy Adam's Rib — the mortgage document providing the flame for a celebratory hotdog roast. A burning of the mortgage served as the opening scene of the 1969 Mayberry R.F.D. episode "Emmett's Retirement". The concept of a mortgage burning party was at least briefly referenced in a 1975 episode of All In The Family, “Mike Makes His Move”. Mortgage burnings were also the premise of a 1977 episode of Eight Is Enough, "Mortgage Burnin' Blues", and a 1982 episode of M*A*S*H, "Settling Debts".

== See also ==
- Foreclosure
