= Bethel United Methodist Church (Lake City, Florida) =

Church building in Florida, United States

Coordinates: 30.131485°N 82.626853°W

Bethel United Methodist Church is located at 4843 South US Hwy. 441 at County Road 133-B in Lake City, Florida. Known as Old Bethel Church, it was first organized by Alligator area settlers as early as the 1820s. The original church was a small log structure located about two miles northeast of its current location. In 1855, the new building was erected to accommodate a growing number of parishioners. It is one of only a few Antebellum church buildings which have survived in rural Florida. Bethel Church has served its congregation continuously since its mid-nineteenth century founding. The building has been known in the community as "the white church by the side of the road" for over one hundred years. There is also a Bethel UMC in Warrenton, Virginia.

== Gallery ==
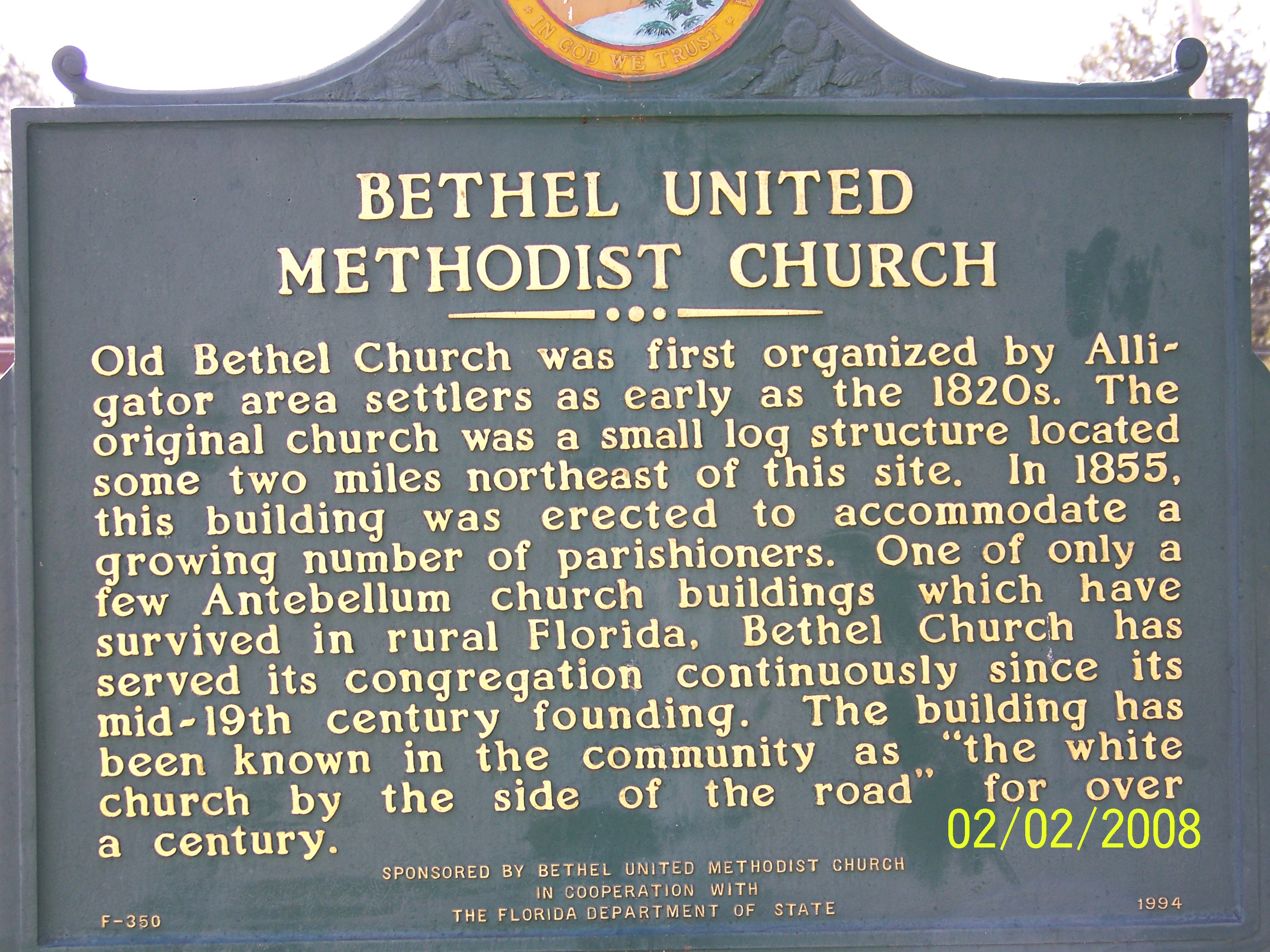
Florida Historical Marker Sign

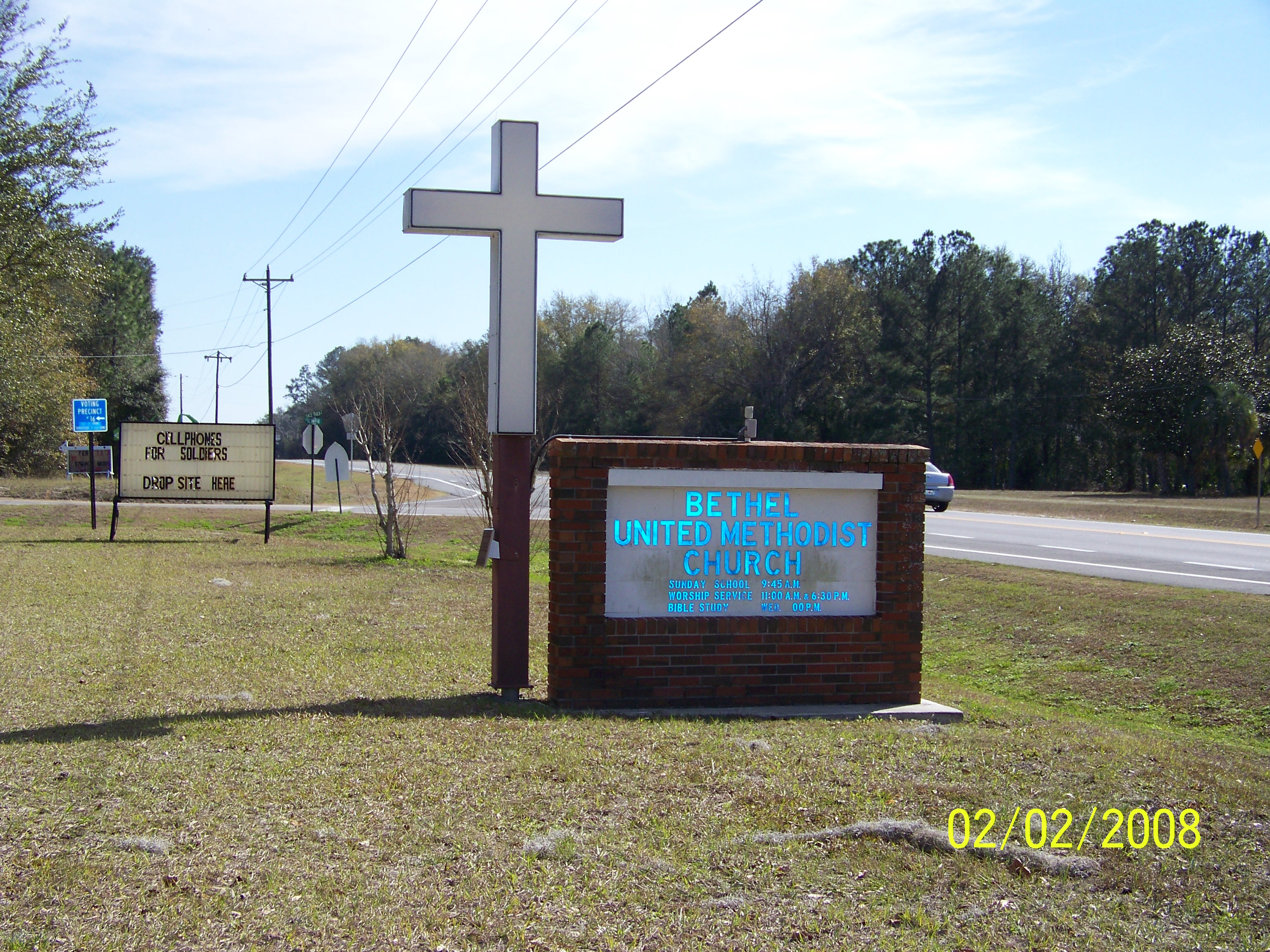
Roadside Sign
