= Bethel AME Church (Iowa City, Iowa) =

- U.S. National Register of Historic Places
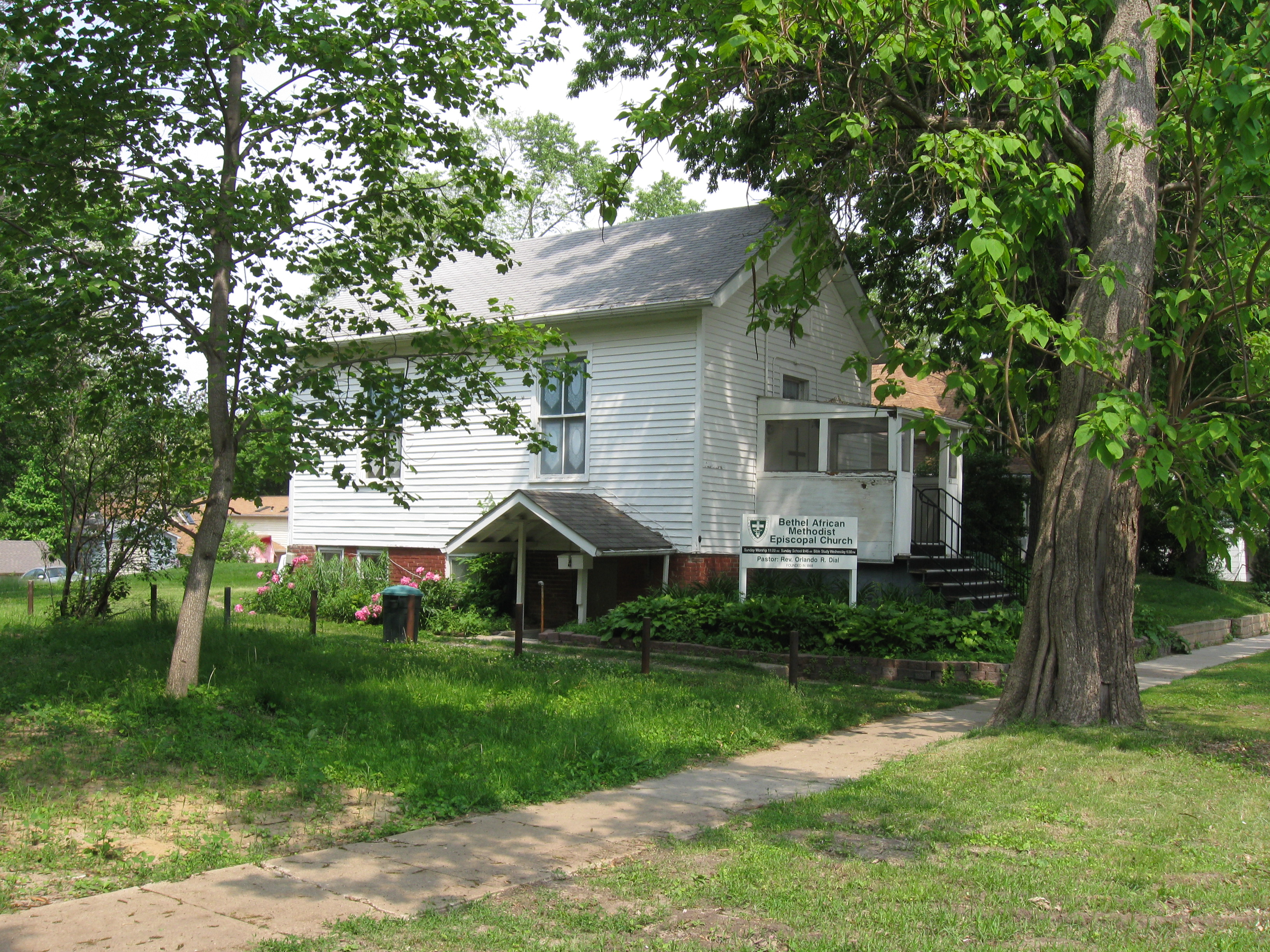
- The church in 2009 before the expansion project

- Location within Iowa Location within the United States
- Location: 411 S. Governor St. Iowa City, Iowa
- Coordinates: 41°39′22″N 91°31′23″W
- Built: 1868
- NRHP reference No.: 00000925
- Added to NRHP: September 27, 2000

Bethel African Methodist Episcopal Church is a historic African American congregation and building in Iowa City, Iowa, United States. The congregation was established in 1868 mostly by free people of color from the south and the rest from the north. James W. Howard, a member of the congregation, bought property in a recent addition to the city and sold the southern half to the church for $50. This white frame church was built on the property the same year. Iowa City has always had a small African American community and over the years the congregation grew and declined in numbers and in finances. The original church, which is 600 square feet (56 m^{2}) and has room for 50 people, was listed on the National Register of Historic Places in 2000. The congregation outgrew the small church and a new 4,000-square-foot (370 m^{2}) sanctuary was built in 2010 that holds three times the current congregation's size.
