= Bethel AME Church (Reno, Nevada) =

Historic church in Nevada, United States

- U.S. National Register of Historic Places
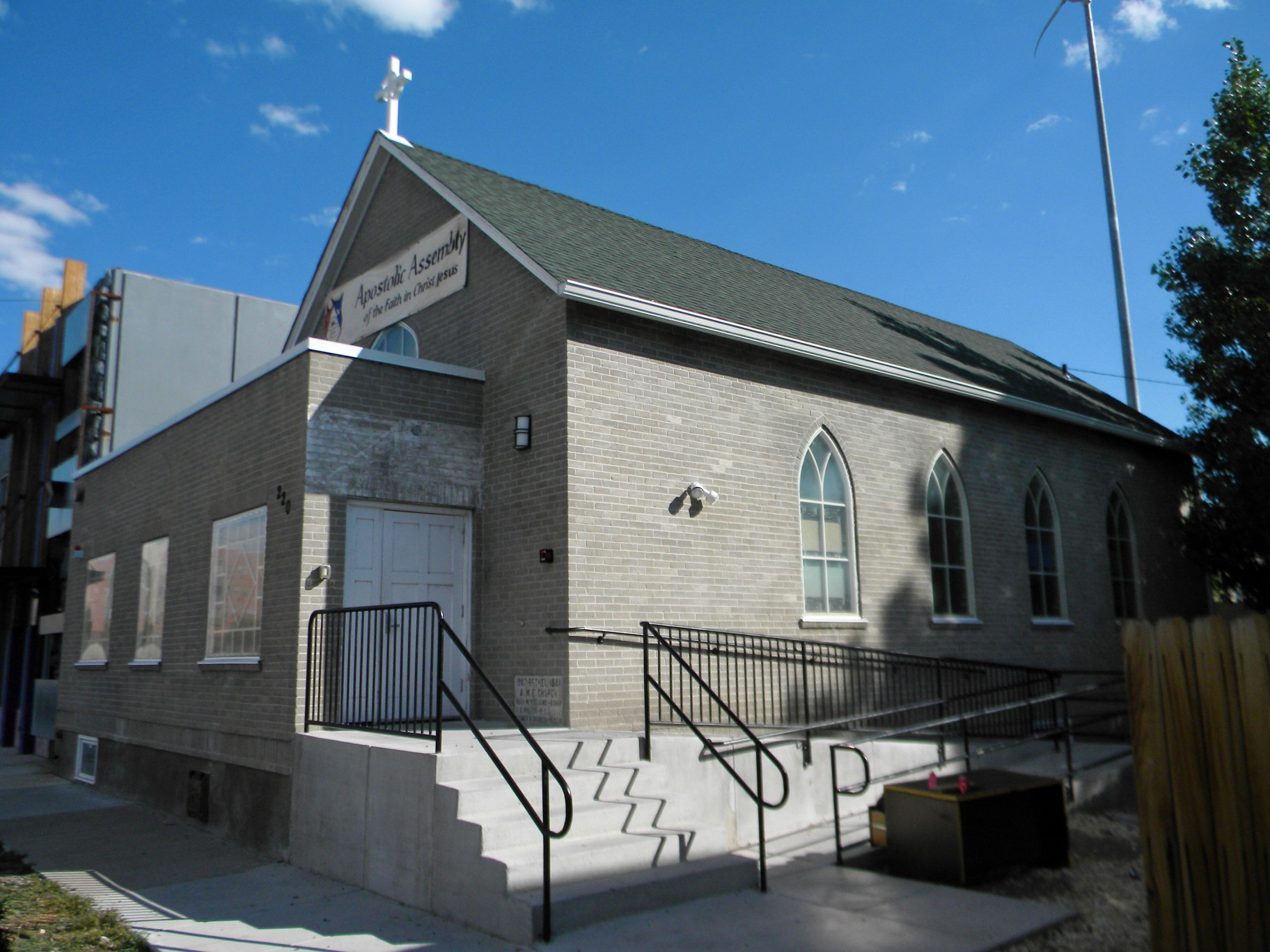

- Location within Nevada Location within the United States
- Location: 220 Bell St., Reno, Nevada
- Coordinates: 39°31′34″N 119°49′13″W
- Area: 0.1 acres (0.040 ha)
- Built: 1910
- Architectural style: Late Gothic Revival, Folk
- NRHP reference No.: 01000587
- Added to NRHP: June 12, 2001

Bethel AME Church is a historic African Methodist Episcopal church at 220 Bell Street in Reno, Nevada. It has served as a hub for Reno's African American community since it was built in 1910 for early black settlers. In addition to its role as a religious and community center, it functioned as a resource center for black divorce seekers who faced difficulties in a segregated city during the middle decades of the twentieth century. In the 1960s, during the American civil rights movement, the church provided a meeting place for the local chapter of the National Association for the Advancement of Colored People (NAACP) and other civil rights activists.

It was added to the National Register of Historic Places in 2001.

In 1993, under the pastoral leadership of Reverend Carey G. Anderson, the congregation moved to 2655 N Rock Boulevard in Sparks, Nevada. The church continues to thrive in the community and has provided countless programs through the years.
