= Bethel Presbyterian Church =

Bethel Presbyterian Church may refer to:

in Singapore

- Bethel Presbyterian Church, Singapore

in the United States

- Bethel Presbyterian Church (Alcorn, Mississippi), listed on the NRHP in Mississippi
- Bethel Presbyterian Church (Bay, Missouri), a Presbyterian historic site
- Bethel Presbyterian Church (McLeansville, North Carolina), another Presbyterian historic site
- Bethel Presbyterian Church (Bethel Park, Pennsylvania), a church and Presbyterian historic site, associated with the Whiskey Rebellion
- Bethel Presbyterian Church (Indiana, Pennsylvania), another Presbyterian historic site
- Bethel Presbyterian Church (Clover, South Carolina), listed on the NRHP in South Carolina
- Bethel Presbyterian Church (Kingston, Tennessee), another Presbyterian historic site
- Bethel Presbyterian Church (Waverly, West Virginia)

== See also ==
- New Bethel Presbyterian Church, Piney Flats, Tennessee, a Presbyterian historic site
