= Bethel AME Church (Shelbyville, Kentucky) =

Historic church in Kentucky, United States

- U.S. National Register of Historic Places
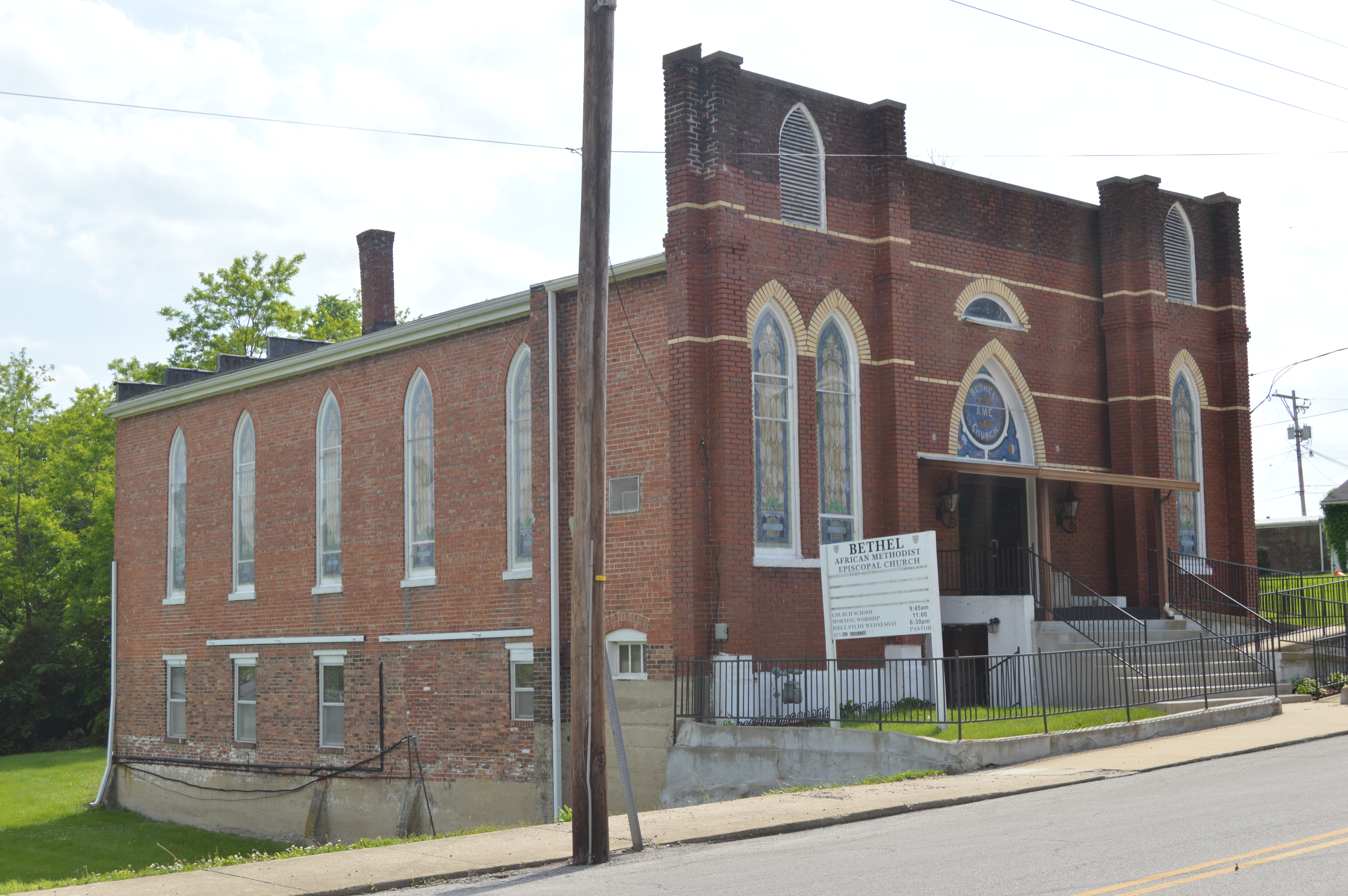
- Eastern side and front

- Location within Kentucky Location within the United States
- Location: 414 Henry Clay St., Shelbyville, Kentucky
- Coordinates: 38°12′35″N 85°12′55″W
- Area: 0.5 acres (0.20 ha)
- Built: 1916
- Architectural style: Gothic Revival
- MPS: Shelbyville MRA
- NRHP reference No.: 84001990
- Added to NRHP: September 28, 1984

The Bethel AME Church in Shelbyville, Kentucky is a historic African Methodist Episcopal church located at 414 Henry Clay Street. It was built in 1916 and added to the National Register of Historic Places in 1984.

It was deemed notable as the "best example of integration of Gothic Revival and Classical Revival styles" among Shelbyville's churches, and it was asserted the "sanctuary is also important in the evolution of black religious life in Shelbyville."

It was listed as part of a larger study of historic resources in Shelbyville.
