= Bethel A.M.E. Church (Richmond, Indiana) =

Historic church in Indiana, United States

- U.S. National Register of Historic Places
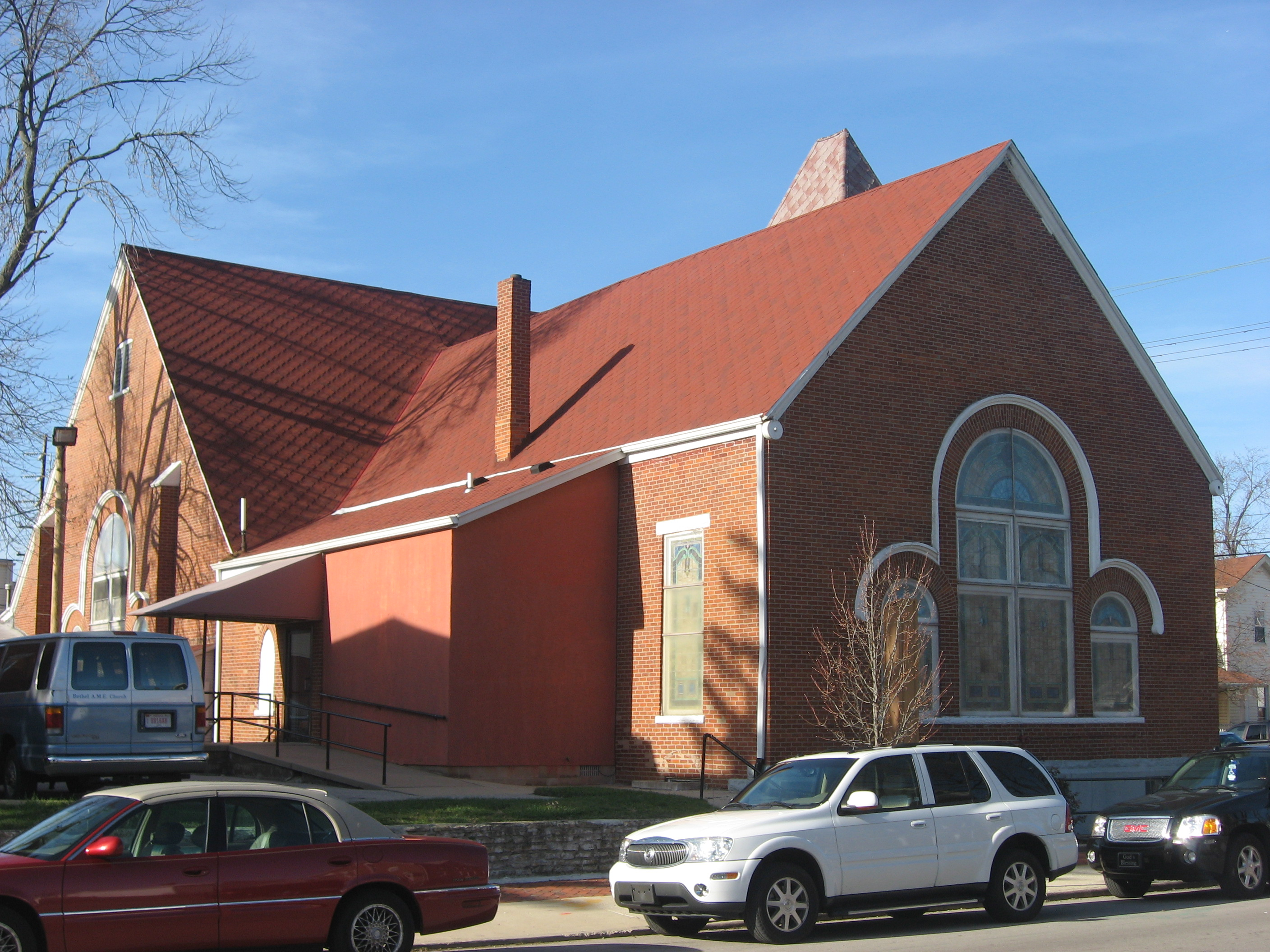
- Bethel AME Church, December 2012

- Location within Indiana
- Location: 200 S. 6th St., Richmond, Indiana
- Coordinates: 39°49′33″N 84°53′41″W
- Area: less than one acre
- Built: 1854, 1892-1894
- Architectural style: Classical Revival, Romanesque
- NRHP reference No.: 75000032
- Added to NRHP: September 5, 1975

Bethel A.M.E. Church is a historic African Methodist Episcopal church located at Richmond, Indiana. The congregation was founded in 1836. The church was built in 1854, and enlarged and remodeled in the Romanesque Revival style with a mix of Neo-classical elements in 1892–1894. It is a one-story, cruciform plan, brick building with a 2 1/2-story bell tower. The church serves as an educational, political, and cultural center for the local African American community.

It was listed on the National Register of Historic Places in 1975.

== Early Church (1836-1868) ==
First settled around 1806, Richmond Indiana was at the frontlines of 19th century Westward expansion. Richmond became home to Quakers, New Englanders, and African Americans. By the 1830s, Wayne County had more than 400 Black residents, many of which lived in and around Richmond. Richmond's Bethel African Methodist Episcopal (AME) demonstrates the importance and affluence of the early 19th century Black community in Richmond. Its survival as a political and cultural center continues to serve as a symbol of Richmond's Black community.

Founded in 1836 by traveling Bishop William Paul Quinn, Bethel Richmond's Church has served the community for almost two centuries. Early church leaders include Cornelius Overman and George Black. After receiving a lot from Gardner Mendenhall, Quinn dedicated the church in 1837. Quinn became the AME's fourth Bishop in 1844. From 1840 to 1845, the Bethel Congregation is recorded to have around 119 members. Richmond became the hub for the AME church's sheltering of fugitive slaves throughout the 1840s and 50s.

Bethel Richmond retains its 1854 minimalist Methodist interior, with simple edges and little flair,

== 'Market-Marion' Church (1868-Present) ==
In 1868, the Bethel Congregation acquired an existing Greek Revival Church at the southwest corner of Market and Marion streets. Bethel Richmond still operates in this 19th century church.

James M. Townsend, a veteran of the 54th Massachusetts Volunteers and pastor of Bethel Richmond, served as assistant secretary of the AME Church's national conference. By 1885, Townsend had set his roots firmly down in Richmond while also becoming the second African American elected to the state legislature. During his tenure, Townsend attempted to abolish all distinctions of race in state laws. He succeeded in producing a bill banning discrimination in public places but failed to right Indiana legislation. Returning to Richmond in 1891, he served as the Bethel Richmond's pastor for two years before moving to the AME congregation in Indianapolis and eventually Chicago.

In response to an increase of lynching nationwide, Bethel Richmond drew up a 1921 resolution denouncing the conditions of Southern States. They urged Indiana's congressmen and senators to draft federal legislation against lynching. The Indianapolis Times would eventually bring to light that many of Indiana's government officials were deeply involved with the Ku Klux Klan.

Aside from an addition in 1892, all exteriors and interiors have remained relatively preserved. Bethel Richmond has been listed on the National Register of Historic Places since 1975. Richmond's congregation is one of the oldest AME churches in Indiana.
