= Bethel Church (Morning Sun, Iowa) =

- U.S. National Register of Historic Places
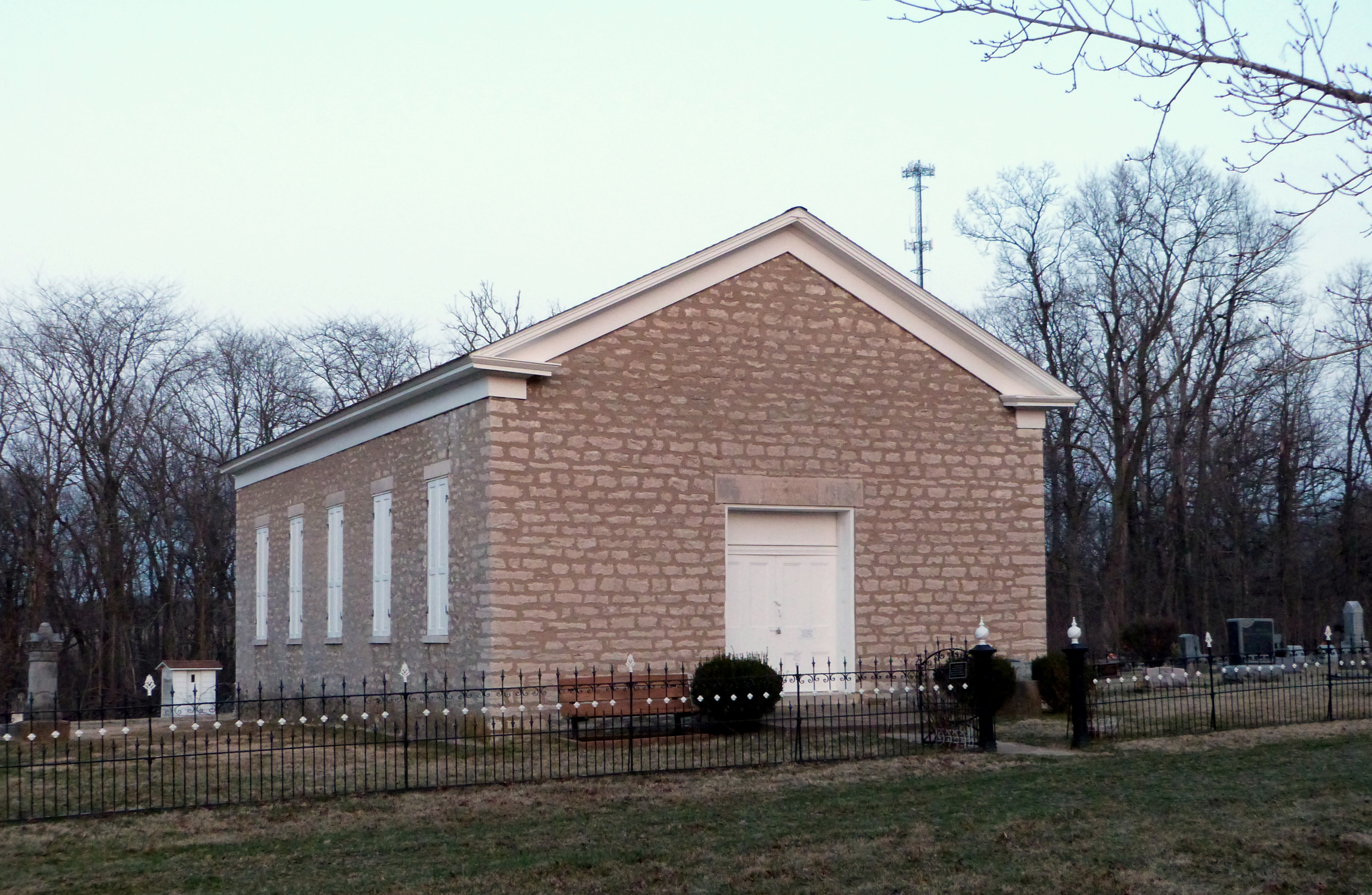
- Bethel Church in 2013.

- Location within Iowa Location within the United States
- Location: NE of Morning Sun, off US 61
- Coordinates: 41°06′37″N 91°11′14″W
- Area: 1.8 acres (0.73 ha)
- Built: 1855
- Built by: Francis McGraw
- Architectural style: Vernacular
- NRHP reference No.: 79003698
- Added to NRHP: February 22, 1979

Bethel Church is a historic church building in rural Morning Sun, Iowa, United States. The congregation was organized by the Wapello mission of the Methodist Episcopal Church in Iowa in 1854. In addition to the Morning Sun congregation, the Wapello mission included congregations in Concord, Long Creek, and two in Wapello. The property for the church building and its adjacent cemetery was donated by Merit Jamison. Members of the congregation built the building under the supervision of stonemason Francis McGraw. The limestone structure is a Vernacular form of Iowa folk architecture. The small cornice returns are influenced by the Greek Revival style. The plain interior features plastered walls, plank flooring and wood-carved furnishings from the church's early years. The iron fence that runs along the gravel road was added in 1861. The church is no used for regularly scheduled services. It was added to the National Register of Historic Places in 1979.
