= Bethel Baptist Chapel, Llanelli =

- Bethel Baptist Chapel, Llanelli
- 51.6732°N 4.1650°W
- Location: Copperworks Road, Llanelli
- Country: Wales
- Denomination: Baptist

History
- Founded: 1840

Architecture
- Heritage designation: Grade II
- Designated: 3 December 1992
- Architectural type: Chapel
- Style: Italianate classical style

Bethel Baptist Chapel is a Baptist chapel in the town of Llanelli, Carmarthenshire, Wales. It was built in 1840 and is located on Copperworks Road. It had a larger seating capacity than most Llanelli chapels and in 1905 could seat 850 persons.

== Early history ==
Bethel Baptist Chapel was the second of a series of Baptist churches erected in Llanelli in the mid nineteenth century. By 1840 the membership of Zion, established near the centre of Llanelli in 1831, had reached 400. A decision was taken to establish a new chapel in the expanding Seaside district.

== The chapel ==
This was a time when Llanelli became a significant regional producer of tinplate and steel and the population was growing strongly. The chapel has a large stuccoed temple-like facade with giant pilasters and a porch with columns and a balustrade. The windows had Florentine tracery. The pulpit was very ornate and had a pedimented back, and the gallery fronts were clad in cast iron panels. The chapel has a larger seating capacity compared to other Llanelli chapels, being able to seat 850 persons in 1905, and the Sunday School was also large, catering for 300 children. A house for the caretaker adjoins the chapel.

The chapel was designated as a Grade II listed building on 3 December 1992, the reason for listing being that it is a fine example of a chapel building of its type and is of particularly striking group value with Siloah Chapel, in Glanmor Road some 70 metres (230 ft) away. The listing includes the adjoining former schoolroom, and the iron railings and two pairs of gates that face onto the street. The Royal Commission on the Ancient and Historical Monuments of Wales curates the archaeological, architectural and historic records for this chapel. These include a number of digital photographs and three Chapels Photographic Societies Collections.
